= List of museums in France =

There are up to 10,000 museums and public art galleries in France according to some estimates. More than 1,200 are recognized by the state as Musée de France, including 64 national museums. This is a list of museums in France by location.

== Auvergne-Rhône-Alpes ==
=== 01 - Ain ===
- Ambérieu-en-Bugey
  - Musée du cheminot
- Ars-sur-Formans
  - Musée de cire du Curé d'Ars
- Bourg-en-Bresse
  - Municipal Museum of Bourg-en-Bresse
  - Musée départemental des Pays de l'Ain

=== 03 - Allier ===
- Moulins
  - Musée de la Visitation
  - Centre National du Costume de Scene
- Montluçon
  - Château de La Louvière
  - Musée des Musiques Populaires

=== 07 - Ardèche ===
- Annonay
  - Musée vivarois

=== 15 - Cantal ===
- Aurillac
  - Musée d'art et d'archéologie

=== 26 - Drôme ===
- Montélimar
  - Musée du château des Adhémar
  - Musée européen de l'aviation de chasse
  - Palais des Bonbons et du Nougat
- Valence
  - Musée des Beaux-Arts et d'Histoire Naturelle

=== 38 - Isère ===
- Aoste
  - Musée gallo-romain
- Champ-sur-Drac
  - Musée Autrefois
- Échirolles
  - Musée de la Viscose
  - Musée Géo-Charles
- Grenoble
  - Musée de l'Ancien Evéché
  - Grenoble Archaeological Museum
  - Musée dauphinois
  - Museum of Grenoble
  - Musée de la Résistance et de la Déportation à Grenoble
  - Muséum d'histoire naturelle de Grenoble
  - Le Magasin
  - Musée des Troupes de Montagne
  - Musée Stendhal
- Jarrie
  - Musée de la Chimie
- La Côte-Saint-André
  - Musée Hector Berlioz
- La Tronche
  - Musée Hébert (La Tronche)
- Vienne
  - Musée des Beaux-Arts et d'Archéologie
  - Musée du cloître de Saint-André-le-Bas
  - Musée archéologique Saint-Pierre
  - Musée de la Draperie
- Vizille
  - Musée de la Révolution française
- Vif
  - Champollion Museum

=== 42 - Loire ===
- Ambierle
  - Musée Alice Taverne
- Saint-Étienne
  - Musée d'art moderne
  - Musée d'art et d'industrie
  - Musée du vieux Saint-Étienne
  - Musée de la mine
  - Musée des transports urbains de Saint-Étienne et sa région
  - L'Astronef
  - Saint-Etienne Mine Museum
- Feurs
  - Musée d'Assier

=== 43 - Haute-Loire ===
- Le Puy-en-Velay
  - Le Musée Crozatier
- Brioude
  - Musée de la Dentelle
  - Musée du Saumon
- Auvers
  - musée de la résistance au Mont Mouchet
- Chavaniac-Lafayette
  - Château de Chavaniac

=== 63 - Puy-de-Dôme ===
- Ambert
  - Moulin Richard de Bas
  - Musée de la fourme
- Arlanc
  - Musée de la dentelle à la main
- Clermont-Ferrand
  - Musée d'Art Roger-Quilliot
  - Musée Bargoin
  - Muséum Henri-Lecoq
- Lezoux
  - Musée départemental de la céramique de Lezoux
- Riom
  - Musée Francisque Mandet
  - Musée Régional d'Auvergne
- Saint-Anthème
  - Musée paysan de la Vallorgue
- Volvic
  - Musée Marcel Sahut
  - Musée Crozatier

=== 69 - Rhône ===
- Beaujeu
  - Musée des traditions populaires Marius Audin
- Lyon
  - African Museum of Lyon
  - Centre d'histoire de la résistance et de la déportation
  - Musée des Beaux-Arts
  - Musée d'art contemporain
  - Musée gallo-romain de Lyon-Fourvière
  - Musée des Confluences
  - Muséum
  - Musée des Tissus et des Arts décoratifs
  - Musée Gadagne
  - Musée de l'Imprimerie
  - Musée Testut Latarjet d'anatomie
  - Musée des Hospices civils de Lyon
  - Musée de la miniature
  - Musée d'histoire de la médecine et de la pharmacie
  - Musée des Sapeurs Pompiers
- Poleymieux-au-Mont-d'Or
  - Musée Ampère
- Rochetaillée-sur-Saône
  - Musée de l'Automobile Henri Malartre
- Saint-Romain-en-Gal
  - Musée gallo-romain de St-Romain-en-Gal
- Villefranche-sur-Saône
  - Musée Paul Dini

=== 73 - Savoie ===
- Aix-les-Bains
  - Musée archéologique
  - Faure Museum (Aix-les-Bains)
- Chambéry
  - Musée des beaux-arts de Chambéry
  - Musée des Charmettes
  - Musée savoisien
  - Muséum d'histoire naturelle
- Conflans
  - Musée d'ethnographie et d'histoire

=== 74 - Haute-Savoie ===
- Annecy
  - Musée-château
  - Château d'Annecy
  - Palais de l'Isle
- Lovagny
  - Château de Montrottier
- Les Gets
  - Musée de la Musique mécanique
- Thonon-les-Bains
  - Musée du Chablais
- Viuz-en-Sallaz
  - Musée du paysan

== Bourgogne-Franche-Comté ==
=== 21 - Côte-d'Or ===
- Alise-Sainte-Reine
  - Musée Alésia
- Auxonne
  - Musée Bonaparte
- Beaune
  - Collégiale Notre-Dame de Beaune
  - Hôpital de la Sainte-Trinité dit hospice de la Charité de Beaune
  - Musée des Beaux-Arts
  - Musée Étienne-Jules Marey
  - Musée de l’Hôtel-Dieu
  - Musée du vin de Bourgogne
- Châtillon-sur-Seine
  - Musée Archéologique
- Dijon
  - Musée des Beaux-Arts
  - Musée Archéologique
  - Musée de la vie bourguignonne Perrin de Puycousin
  - Musée Magnin
  - Musée d'art sacré
  - Muséum d’histoire naturelle
  - Musée Rude
- Montbard
  - Musée des Beaux-Arts
  - Musée Buffon
- Nuits-Saint-Georges
  - Musée municipal
- Saint-Jean-de-Losne
  - Maison des mariniers
- Saulieu
  - Musée François Pompon
- Savigny-lès-Beaune
  - Musée Château de Savigny
- Semur-en-Auxois
  - Musée municipal de Semur-en-Auxois

=== 25 - Doubs ===
- Belvoir
  - Musée du Chateau
- Besançon
  - Hôpital Saint-Jacques
  - Fonds régional d'art contemporain
  - Musée Comtois
  - Musée de la Résistance et de la Déportation
  - Musée des Beaux-Arts et d'Archéologie
  - Musée du Temps
  - Musée lapidaire de l'Abbatiale Saint-Paul
  - Museum d'Histoire Naturelle
- Montbéliard
  - Musée Beurnier-Rossel
  - Musée du Chateau
- Nancray
  - Musée de Plein Air des Maison Comtoises
- Nans-sous-Sainte-Anne
  - Taillanderie de Nans-sous-Sainte-Anne
- Ornans
  - Musée Courbet (Gustave Courbet Museum)
- Pontarlier
  - Musée Municipal
- Sochaux
  - Musée Peugeot
- Valentigney
  - Musée de la paysannerie et des vieux métiers

=== 39 - Jura ===
- Arbois
  - La Maison de Louis Pasteur
  - Musée de la vigne et du Vin
  - Musée Sarret de Grozon
- Bois-d'Amont
  - Musée de la Boissellerie
- Champagnole
  - Musée d'archéologie
- Dole
  - Museum of Fine Arts, Dole
- Lons-le-Saunier
  - Musée d'Archéologie
  - Musée des Beaux-Arts
- Moirans-en-Montagne
  - Musée du Jouet
- Morez
  - Musée de la lunette
- Saint-Claude
  - Musée des Beaux-Arts
- Salins-les-Bains
  - Musée des Salines
  - Musées des Techniques et Cultures Comtoises

=== 58 - Nièvre ===
- Château-Chinon
  - Musée du Costume
  - Musée du Septennat
- Clamecy
  - Musée Romain Rolland
- Cosne-sur-Loire
  - Musée de la marine de Loire
- Nevers
  - Musée municipal Frédéric Blandin
  - Musée archéologique du Nivernais

=== 70 - Haute-Saône ===
- Champlitte
  - Musée Départemental Albert Demard
- Fougerolles
  - Écomusée du Pays de la Cerise
- Gray
  - Musée Baron Martin
- Haut-du-Them-Château-Lambert
  - Musée Départemental de la Montagne Albert Demard
- Luxeuil-les-Bains
  - Musée de la Tour des Échevins
  - Musée du Combattant de la haute Saône
- Ronchamp
  - Musée de la Mine de Ronchamp
- Vesoul
  - Musée Georges Garret

=== 71 - Saône-et-Loire ===
- Autun
  - Musée Rolin
  - Musée Lapidaire Saint-Nicolas
  - Musée Verger-Tarin
  - Cathédrale (salle capitulaire)
- Bourbon-Lancy
  - Musée Saint-Nazaire
- Chalon-sur-Saône
  - Musée Nicéphore Niépce
  - Musée Vivant Denon
- Charolles
  - Musée du Prieuré
  - Musée René Davoine
- Cluny
  - musée Ochier
- Dompierre-les-Ormes
  - Galerie européenne de la forêt et du bois (European Gallery of forest and wood)
- Le Creusot
  - Ecomusée de la Communauté Le Creusot Montceau
  - Musée de l'homme et de l'industrie
- Mâcon
  - Musée des Ursulines
  - Musée Lamartine
- Marcigny
  - Musée de la Tour et du Moulin
- Paray-le-Monial
  - Musée eucharistique du Hiéron
- Pierre-de-Bresse
  - Ecomusée de la Bresse Bourguignonne

=== 89 - Yonne ===
- Auxerre
  - Musée Saint-Germain
  - Muséum d’histoire naturelle
  - Musée Leblanc-Duvernoy
- Avallon
  - Musée de l’Avallonnais
  - Musée du costume
- Noyers-sur-Serein
  - Naïve art museum of Noyers
- Saint-Père-sous-Vézelay
  - Archaeological museum of Saint-Père-sous-Vézelay
- Sens
  - Musée de Sens
- Vézelay
  - Zervos Museum
  - Musée de la Pierre écrite
  - Musée de l'Œuvre Viollet-le-Duc

=== 90 - Territoire de Belfort ===
- Beaucourt
  - Musée Frédéric Japy
- Belfort
  - Musée d'Art et d'Histoire
  - Collection d'Art Moderne «Maurice Jardot»
- Étueffont
  - Forge-Musée d'Etueffont

== Brittany ==
=== 22 - Côtes-d'Armor ===
- Saint-Brieuc
  - Musée d'Art et d'Histoire
- Dinan
  - Musée du château
  - Musée du Rail
- Lamballe
  - Musée Mathurin-Méheut
- Langueux
  - Musée de la Briqueterie
- Léhon
  - Musée 39-45
- Perros-Guirec
  - Musée de cire
- Pleumeur-Bodou
  - Cité des télécoms
- La Poterie
  - Musée de la Poterie

=== 29 - Finistère ===
- Brest
  - Musée des Beaux-Arts de Brest
  - Musée National de la marine de Brest (Site officiel du musée de la Marine)
  - Océanopolis
  - Tour Tanguy
- Camaret-sur-Mer
  - Musée naval
- Concarneau
  - Musée de la pêche
- Douarnenez
  - Le Port-Musée
- Ergué-Gabéric
  - Musée de l'Océanographie
- Morlaix
  - Quimper
- Pont-Aven
  - Musée des Beaux-Arts de Pont-Aven
  - Musée Paul Gauguin
- Quimper
  - Musée départemental breton
  - Musée de l'alambic
  - Musée des Beaux-Arts de Quimper

=== 35 - Ille-et-Vilaine ===
- Baguer-Morvan
  - Musée de la Paysannerie
- Cesson-Sévigné
  - Musée des Transmissions
- Dol-de-Bretagne
  - Cathédraloscope
- Lohéac
  - Manoir de l'automobile
- Montfort-sur-Meu
  - Ecomusée du pays de Montfort
- Rennes
  - Musée des Beaux-Arts
  - Musée de Bretagne
  - Ecomusée de la Bintinais
- Vitré
  - Musée Saint-Nicolas
  - Musée du Château de Vitré
  - Musée des Rochers-Sévigné
- Montreuil-sous-Pérouse
  - Musée du Manoir de la Faucillonnaie

=== 56 - Morbihan ===
- Baden
  - Musée des Passions et des Ailes
- Carnac
  - Musée de la Préshitoire
- Étel
  - Musée des Thoniers
- Josselin
  - Musée de Poupées
- Le Faouët
  - Musée du Faouet
- La Gacilly
  - le Végétarium Yves Rocher
- La Roche-Bernard
  - Musée de la Vilaine maritime
- Lorient
  - Musée de la compagnie des Indes
- Plouay
  - Musée du vélo : Véloparc
- Port-Louis
  - Musée de la Marine
- Saint-Marcel
  - Musée de la Résistance bretonne
- Vannes
  - Musée de la Cohue

== Centre-Val de Loire ==
=== 18 - Cher ===
- Bourges
  - Musée Estève
  - Palais Jacques Coeur
- Meillant
- Château-Musée Meillant
- Menetou-Salon
  - Musée de Menetou-Salon

=== 28 - Eure-et-Loir ===
- Chartres
  - Centre International du Vitrail
  - Musée des Beaux Arts de Chartres
- Illiers-Combray
  - Musée Marcel Proust
- Mainvilliers
  - Conservatoire de l'agriculture (Compa)

=== 36 - Indre ===
- Azay-le-Ferron
  - Château-musée
- Châteauroux
  - Musée Bertrand
- Issoudun
  - Musée de l'Hospice Saint-Roch
- Valençay
  - Musée de l'automobile de Valençay
- Vatan
  - Musée du cirque

=== 37 - Indre-et-Loire ===
- Amboise
  - Musée de l'Hôtel de Ville
  - Musée de La Poste
- Azay-le-Rideau
  - Château d'Azay-le-Rideau
  - Musée Maurice Dufresne
- Tours
  - Musée des Beaux-Arts de Tours
  - Musée du Compagnonnage
  - Château de Saché

=== 41 - Loir-et-Cher ===
- Pontlevoy
  - Musée du poids lourd
- Romorantin-Lanthenay
  - Musée de la course automobile
- Blois
  - Château de Blois
  - La Maison de la Magie Robert-Houdin

=== 45 - Loiret ===
- Beaugency
  - Musée Daniel Vannier
- Briare
  - Musée des deux marines
  - Musée de la mosaïque et des Emaux de Briare
- Châteauneuf-sur-Loire
  - Musée de la marine de Loire du Vieux-Châteauneuf et sa région
- Dampierre-en-Burly
  - Musée de l'Illusion et du Cirque
- Gien
  - Musée International de la Chasse
- Pithiviers
  - Musée des transports

== Corsica ==
=== 2A - Southern Corsica ===
- Ajaccio
  - Musée Fesch
  - Musée des Milelli
  - Musée napoléonien
  - Musée national de la maison Bonaparte
- Levie
  - Musée d'archéologie et d'ethnographie
- Sartène
  - Musée départemental de préhistoire

=== 2B - Upper Corsica ===
- Aléria
  - Musée archéologique
  - Departmental Museum of archaeology Gilort (Jérôme) Carcopino
- Bastia
  - Musée d'ethnographie corse
- Corte
  - Musée régional d'anthropologie
- Morosaglia
  - Musée Pascal-Paoli

== French Polynesia ==
- Paul Gauguin Cultural Center
- Paul Gauguin Museum (Tahiti)
- Musée de Tahiti et des Îles
- Robert Wan Pearl Museum

== Grand Est ==
=== 08 - Ardennes ===
- Bazeilles
  - Maison de la dernière cartouche
- Mouzon
  - Musée-Atelier Textile du Feutre
- Novion-Porcien
  - Musée Guerre et Paix en Ardennes

=== 10 - Aube ===
- Ricey
- Musée des vieux tacots
- Troyes
  - Musée d'Art Moderne Donation Pierre et Denise Lévy
  - Maison de l'Outil

=== 51 - Marne (département) ===
- Reims
  - Centre historique de l'automobile
  - Palais du Tau

=== 52 - Haute-Marne ===
- Bourbonne-les-Bains
  - Musée Municipal d'Archéologie et de Peinture
- Chaumont
  - Maison du Livre et de l'affiche
  - Musée d'art et d'histoire
  - Musée de la Crèche
- Langres
  - Musée d'art et d'histoire

=== 54 - Meurthe-et-Moselle ===
- Baccarat
  - Musée de la cristallerie
- Jarville-la-Malgrange
  - Musée de l'histoire du fer
- Lunéville
  - Musée du château
- Nancy
  - Muséum-Aquarium de Nancy
  - Musée Lorrain
  - Musée de l'École de Nancy (Art Nouveau)
  - Musée des Beaux-Arts
- Saint-Nicolas-de-Port
  - Musée français de la brasserie
  - Musée du cinéma et de la photographie
- Toul
  - Musée d'Art et d'Histoire
- Vannes-le-Châtel
  - Cristallerie Daum
- Velaine-en-Haye
  - Musée de l'automobile de Lorraine

=== 55 - Meuse ===
- Bar-le-Duc
  - Musée Barrois
- Stenay
  - Musée européen de la bière
- Verdun
  - Centre mondial de la paix
  - Musée de la Princerie

=== 57 - Moselle ===
- Amnéville-les-Thermes :
  - Musée de la moto et du vélo - classé Trésor national
- Aumetz et Neufchef :
  - Musée des mines de fer de Lorraine
- Bitche :
  - Musée de la Citadelle de Bitche
- Marsal :
  - Musée départemental du sel
- Meisenthal :
  - Maison du verre et du cristal
- Metz :
  - Museums of Metz
  - Centre Pompidou-Metz
- Petite-Rosselle
  - Musée du Bassin Houiller Carreau Wendel
- Sarreguemines
  - Musée de la Faïencerie
- Thionville :
  - Musée de la Tour aux Puces
  - Carreau Wendel Museum
- Vic-sur-Seille :
  - Musée Georges de La Tour

=== 67 - Bas-Rhin ===
- Albé
  - Maison du Val de Villé
- Barr
  - Musée de la Folie Marco
- Betschdorf
  - Musée de la poterie
- Bischheim
  - Musée rituel juif
- Bischwiller
  - Maison des Arts
  - Musée de la Laub
  - Musée du centenaire (1888–1988)
- Bouxwiller
  - Musée du Pays de Hanau
  - Musée judéo-alsacien de Bouxwiller
- Brumath
  - Musée archéologique
  - Musée Gustave-Stoskopf
  - Musée de l'hôpital psychiatrique
- Colroy-la-Roche
  - Musée d'apiculture
- Dambach-Neunhoffen
  - Musée de la casemate Ligne Maginot
- Dehlingen
  - Musée de Dehlingen, villa et jardin gallo-romains du Gurtelbach
- Dossenheim-sur-Zinsel
  - Musée des arts et traditions populaires de Dossenheim-sur-Zinzel
  - Refuge fortifié de Dossenheim-sur-Zinsel
- Drachenbronn-Birlenbach
  - Musée de la fortification Maginot
- Erstein
  - Musée Würth
  - Etappenstall Maison du patrimoine
- Eschau
  - Musée des traditions des arts populaires et de l'archéologie
- Geispolsheim
  - Musée "Les secrets du chocolat"
- Gertwiller
  - Musée du pain d'épices et de l'Art Populaire Alsacien
  - Musée viti-vinicole
- Gottesheim
  - Musée des arts et des traditions populaires
- Grandfontaine
  - Musée de la mine de fer de Framont
  - Musée du Framont (musée de la 2 CV Citroën)
- Graufthal
  - Maison des Rochers de Graufthal
- Haguenau
  - Musée alsacien (Haguenau)
  - Musée historique de Haguenau
- Hatten
  - Musée de la casemate Esch Ligne Maginot
  - Musée de l'Abri Hatten Ligne Maginot
- Hochfelden
  - Musée du pays de la Zorn
- Hunspach
  - Fort de Schoenenbourg
- Klingenthal
  - Maison de la manufacture d'armes blanches
- Kutzenhausen
  - Maison rurale de l'Outre-Forêt
- La Petite-Pierre
  - Musée des Arts et Traditions populaires de La Petite-Pierre
  - Musée du sceau alsacien de La Petite-Pierre
- Lembach
  - P'tit Fleck
  - Ouvrage du Four à chaux Ligne Maginot
- Leutenheim
  - Abri du Heidenbuckel
- Lichtenberg
  - Château de Lichtenberg
- Marckolsheim
  - Mémorial-Musée de la Ligne Maginot du Rhin
- Marmoutier
  - Centre européen de l'Orgue Flûtes du Monde
  - Musée d'arts et traditions populaires
- Merkwiller-Pechelbronn
  - Musée français du pétrole
- Molsheim
  - Musée de la Chartreuse et Fondation Bugatti
- Mutzig
  - Fort de Mutzig
  - Musée municipal
- Neuviller-la-Roche
  - Musée des arts et traditions populaires de Neuviller
- Niederbronn-les-Bains
  - Maison de l'archéologie des Vosges du Nord
- Obersteinbach
  - Maison des châteaux-forts d'Obersteinbach
- Offendorf
  - Musée de la batellerie Péniche Cabro
- Offwiller
  - Maison d'Offwiller
- Orschwiller
  - Château du Haut-Kœnigsbourg
- Pfaffenhoffen
  - Musée de l'image populaire
- Ranrupt
  - Musée de la scierie à Haut-Fer
- Reichshoffen
  - Musée du fer, musée historique et industriel
- Reichstett
  - Parc de la maison alsacienne
- Saint-Louis-lès-Bitche
  - Musée du Cristal
- Sarre-Union
  - Musée régional de l'Alsace Bossue
- Saverne
  - Tour du télégraphe Chappe du Haut-Barr
  - Musée du château des Rohan
- Schirmeck
  - Mémorial de l'Alsace-Moselle
  - Musée de la Côte du château de Schirmeck
- Sélestat
  - Bibliothèque humaniste
  - Maison du pain d'Alsace
- Seltz
  - Musée Krumacker d'archéologie
- Strasbourg
  - Cabinet des estampes et des dessins
  - Musée Tomi Ungerer
  - Musée alsacien
  - Musée archéologique
  - Musée d'art moderne et contemporain
  - Musée de l’Œuvre Notre-Dame
  - Musée des Arts décoratifs
  - Musée des Beaux-Arts de Strasbourg
  - Musée historique de Strasbourg
  - Musée zoologique
  - Musée de minéralogie
  - Musée de sismologie et de magnétisme terrestre
  - Naviscope Alsace
  - Planétarium de Strasbourg
  - Le Vaisseau
- Truchtersheim
  - Maison du Kochersberg
- Uhlwiller
  - Musée du pain
- Waldersbach
  - Musée Jean-Frédéric Oberlin
- Wimmenau
  - Maison de l'histoire et des traditions de la Haute-Moder
- Wingen-sur-Moder
  - Musée Lalique
- Wissembourg
  - Musée Pierre Jost
  - Musée Westercamp
- Wœrth
  - Musée de la Bataille du 6 août 1870

=== 68 - Haut-Rhin ===
- Altkirch
  - Musée sundgauvien
- Cernay
  - Musée de la Porte de Thann
- Colmar
  - Musée d'Unterlinden
  - Musée Bartholdi
  - Musée d'histoire naturelle et d'ethnographie
  - Musée du jouet
  - Musée des usines municipales
- Guebwiller
  - Musée du Florival
- Muhlbach-sur-Munster
  - Musée de la Schlitte et des métiers du bois
- Mulhouse
  - Cité de l'automobile - Collection Schlumpf
  - Musée Français du Chemin de Fer
  - Électropolis
  - Musée des Beaux-Arts de Mulhouse
  - Musée historique de Mulhouse
  - Musée de l'impression sur étoffe
- Rixheim
  - Musée du papier peint
- Rouffach
  - Musée du bailliage de Rouffach
- Saint-Louis
  - Musée d'art contemporain Fernet Branca

=== 88 - Vosges ===
- Bains-les-Bains
  - Manufacture royale de Bains-les-Bains
- Bruyères
  - Musée Henri Mathieu, arts populaires
- Épinal
  - Musée du Chapitre, musée archéologique et historique
  - Musée de l'image, imagerie d'Épinal
  - Musée départemental d'Art ancien et contemporain
- Fontenoy-le-Château
  - Broderie de Fontenoy-le-Château
- Mirecourt
  - Musée de la lutherie
  - Musée de la Lutherie et de l'Archèterie françaises
- Remiremont
- Saint-Dié-des-Vosges
  - Musée Pierre-Noël de Saint-Dié-des-Vosges
- Ville-sur-Illon
  - Écomusée vosgien de la brasserie
- Vincey
  - Musée militaire de Vincey
- Xonrupt-Longemer

== Guadeloupe ==
- Terre-de-Haut Island, in the Îles des Saintes
  - Fort Napoléon des Saintes

== Hauts-de-France ==
=== 02 - Aisne ===
- Blérancourt
  - Musée de la Coopération franco-américaine
- Tergnier
  - Musée de la Résistance et de la Déportation de Picardie (Fargniers)
- Villers-Cotterêts
  - Cité Internationale de la Langue Française

=== 59 - Nord (département) ===
- Avesnes-sur-Helpe
  - Musée de la Société d'archéologie
- Bailleul
  - Musée Benoît-de-Puydt
- Bergues
  - Musée municipal
- Bousies
  - Musée des Évolutions
- Cambrai
  - Musée des Beaux-Arts de Cambrai
- Le Cateau-Cambrésis
  - Musée Matisse
- Douai
  - Musée de la Chartreuse
- Dunkirk
  - Lieu d'Art et d'Action Contemporaine (LAAC)
  - Musée des Beaux-Arts
  - Musée portuaire
- Gravelines
  - Musée du Dessin et de l'Estampe original
- Lille
  - Palais des Beaux-Arts
  - Centre d'art sacré contemporain
  - Muséum d'histoire naturelle
  - Maison de l'Architecture et de la Ville
  - Musée des canonniers
  - Hospice Comtesse
- Roubaix
  - La Piscine, Musée d'art et d'industrie
  - Manufacture des Flandres / Musée du Jacquard
- Tourcoing
  - Musée des Beaux-Arts
  - Verlaine Message Museum
- Valenciennes
  - Musée des Beaux-Arts
- Villeneuve-d'Ascq
  - Musée d'Art Moderne Lille Métropole

=== 60 - Oise ===
- Beauvais
  - Musée départemental de l'Oise
  - Musée de la tapisserie
- Chantilly
  - Musée Condé (2^{e} musée de France par sa collection : peintures, gravures, dessins, manuscrits)
  - Musée Vivant du Cheval
- Compiègne
  - Musée du château de Compiègne
  - Musée national de la voiture et du tourisme
  - Musée de la maquette
- Longueil-Annel
  - La Cité des bateliers
- Pierrefonds
  - Château de Pierrefonds

=== 62 - Pas-de-Calais ===
- Arras
  - Musée des Beaux-Arts
  - Carrière Wellington
- Béthune
  - Musée d'Ethnologie Régionale de Béthune
- Calais
  - Musée des Beaux-Arts et de la Dentelle de Calais
- Étaples
  - Musée d'Archéologie Quentovic
- Helfaut
  - La Coupole
- Oignies
  - Musée de la mine
- Saint-Omer
  - Musée de l'hôtel Sandelin

=== 80 - Somme ===
- Abbeville
  - Musée Boucher de Perthes
- Albert
  - Musée Somme 1916 aussi appelé "Musée des Abris"
- Amiens
  - Musée de Picardie
  - Collection Charles de l'Escalopier
  - Musée de l'Hôtel de Berny
- Péronne
  - Musée Municipal A. Danicourt
  - Museum of the Great War

== Île-de-France ==
=== 77 - Seine-et-Marne ===
- Barbizon
  - Maison atelier Jean-François Millet
  - Musée départemental de l'École de Barbizon
- Chelles
  - Musée Alfred-Bonno
- Coulommiers
  - Musée municipal des Capucins
- Coupvray
  - Musée Louis Braille
- Égreville
  - Jardin-musée Bourdelle d'Égreville
- Fontainebleau
  - Musée de Fontainebleau
  - Musée d'Art et d'Histoire Militaire
- Lagny-sur-Marne
  - Musée Gatien-Bonnet
- Le Mée-sur-Seine
  - Musée Chapu
- Longueville
  - Dépôt-musée de Longueville
- Meaux
  - Musée Bossuet
- Melun
  - Musée de Melun
- Nemours
  - Musée de Préhistoire d'Île-de-France
  - Château-musée de Nemours
- Saint-Cyr-sur-Morin
  - Musée départemental des Pays de Seine-et-Marne
- Vulaines-sur-Seine
  - Musée départemental Stéphane Mallarmée

=== 78 - Yvelines ===
- Conflans-Sainte-Honorine
  - Musée de la batellerie
- Saint-Germain-en-Laye
  - Musée Claude-Debussy
  - Musée des Antiquités Nationales
  - Musée départemental Maurice Denis "The Priory"
- Versailles
  - Musée et domaine national des Châteaux de Versailles et de Trianon
  - Public Establishment of the Palace, Museum and National Estate of Versailles
- Vicq
  - International Museum of Naive Art

=== 91 - Essonne ===
- Athis-Mons
  - Musée Delta Athis Paray Aviation
- Bièvres
  - Musée de la Photographie
- Brunoy
  - Musée Robert Dubois-Corneau
- Évry
  - Musée Paul Delouvrier
- La Ferté-Alais
  - Aérodrome de Cerny
- Montgeron
  - Musée Josèphe Jacquiot
- Palaiseau
  - Musée du Hurepoix

=== 92 - Hauts-de-Seine ===
- Boulogne-Billancourt
  - Musée des Années Trente
- Colombes
  - Musée des transports urbains, interurbains et ruraux
- Issy-les-Moulineaux
  - Musée Français de la Carte à Jouer
- Rueil-Malmaison
  - Musée national du château de Bois-Préau
  - Musée national du château de Malmaison
- Sceaux
  - Musée de l'Île-de-France
- Sèvres
  - Sèvres – Cité de la céramique

=== 93 - Seine-Saint-Denis ===
- Le Bourget
  - Musée de l'Air et de l'Espace
- Rosny-sous-Bois
  - ROSNY-RAIL : Musée Régional du Chemin de Fer de Rosny-sous-Bois

=== 94 - Val-de-Marne ===
- Champigny-sur-Marne
  - Musée de la Résistance Nationale
- Maisons-Alfort
  - Musée Fragonard
- Nogent-sur-Marne
  - Musée de Nogent-sur-Marne
- Saint-Maur-des-Fossés
  - Villa Médicis - Carré Médicis
- Vincennes
  - Musée historique du donjon de Vincennes
- Vitry-sur-Seine
  - Musée d'Art Contemporain du Val-de-Marne (Mac/Val)

=== 95 - Val-d'Oise ===
- Argenteuil
  - Musée d'Argenteuil
- Butry-sur-Oise
  - Musée des tramways à vapeur et des chemins de fer secondaires français
- Écouen
  - Musée national de la Renaissance
- Guiry-en-Vexin
  - Musée archéologique départemental du Val-d'Oise
- L'Isle-Adam
  - Musée d'art et d'histoire Louis Senlecq
- Louvres
  - Archéa
- Montmorency
  - Musée Jean-Jacques Rousseau
- Pontoise
  - Musée Tavet-Delacour
  - Musée Pissarro

== Normandy ==
- See List of museums in Upper Normandy

=== 14 - Calvados ===
- Avranches
  - Musée de la 2nde guerre mondiale
- Arromanches-les-Bains
  - Musée du débarquement
- Bayeux
  - Mémorial du Général de Gaulle
  - Musée Baron Gérard
  - Musée de la Tapisserie de Bayeux
  - Musée mémorial de la Bataille de Normandie
- Beaumont-en-Auge
  - Musée Langlois
- Caen
  - Musée des Beaux-Arts
  - Musée de Normandie
  - Mémorial pour la paix
  - Musée de la Poste et des Télécommunications
- Courseulles-sur-Mer
  - Juno Beach Centre
- Falaise
  - musée août 1944
- Honfleur
  - Musée Eugène Boudin - Musée de la marine
- Le Molay-Littry
  - Musée de la meunerie
- Livarot
  - Musée du fromage
- Ouistreham
  - Musée du mur de l’Atlantique
- Pont-l'Évêque
  - Musée de la belle époque de l'automobile
- Saint-Pierre-sur-Dives
  - Musée des techniques fromagères
- Vieux
  - Musée archéologique de Vieux-la-Romaine

=== 27 - Eure ===
- Bernay
  - Musée Municipal
- Giverny
  - Musée des Impressionnismes (formerly Musée d'Art Américain)
  - Musée Claude Monet
  - Musée Baudy
- Vernon
  - Musée Alphonse Georges Poulain

=== 50 - Manche ===
- Avranches
  - Le Scriptorial, Musée des Manuscrits du Mont-Saint-Michel
  - Musée municipal
- Cherbourg-Octeville
  - Musée Thomas Henry
  - Muséum d'histoire naturelle d'archéologie et d'ethnographie
  - Musée de la Libération
- Coutances
  - Musée Quesnel Morinière
- Ger
  - Musée Régional de la Poterie
- Granville
  - Musée d'Art Moderne Richard Anacréon
  - Musée Christian Dior
  - Musée océanographique du Roc
- Gréville-Hague
  - Maison natale Jean-François Millet
- Omonville-la-Petite
  - Maison Jacques Prévert
- Regnéville-sur-Mer
  - Fours_à_chaux_du_Rey_-_Musée_Maritime_de_Regnéville
- Saint-Lô
  - Musée des Beaux-Arts et d'Histoire
- Saint-Michel-de-Montjoie
  - Parc-Musée du Granit
- Saint-Vaast-la-Hougue
  - Musée maritime de l'Ile Tatihou
- Sainte-Mère-Église
  - Musée Airborne
  - Ferme-musée du Cotentin
- Réseau départemental des sites et musées de la Manche

=== 61 - Orne ===
- Alençon
  - Musée des Beaux-Arts et de la Dentelle
- Tourouvre
  - Maison de l'Émigration française au Canada
- Flers
  - Musée du Bocage normand.

=== 76 - Seine-Maritime ===
- Caudebec-en-Caux
  - Musée de la marine de Seine
- Duclair
  - Musée août 44
- Le Havre
  - Musée des Beaux-Arts André Malraux
- Montville
  - Musée des Sapeurs-pompiers de France
- Notre-Dame-de-Bondeville
  - Musée industriel de la corderie Vallois
- Rouen
  - Musée départemental des antiquités
  - Musée des Beaux-Arts
  - Musée de la céramique
  - Musée Flaubert et d'histoire de la médecine
  - Muséum d'Histoire Naturelle de Rouen
  - Musée Jeanne-d'Arc
  - Musée Le Secq des Tournelles
  - Maritime, Fluvial and Harbour Museum of Rouen
  - Musée national de l'Éducation
  - Gros Horloge
  - Tour Jeanne d'Arc
- Lillebonne
  - Musée de Lillebonne

== Nouvelle-Aquitaine ==
=== 16 - Charente ===
- Angoulême
  - Musée des Beaux-Arts d'Angoulême
  - Musée du papier
  - Musée de la Bande Dessinée
  - Musée de la société archéologique et historique de la Charente
  - Musée de la résistance et de la déportation d'Angoulême
- Cognac
  - Musée d'Art et d'Histoire
  - Musée des Arts du Cognac

=== 17 - Charente-Maritime ===
- Île-d'Aix
  - Musée national Africain
  - Musée Napoléon
- Rochefort
  - Musée naval
- Saint-Martin-de-Ré, Île de Ré
  - Ernest Cognacq Museum

=== 19 - Corrèze ===
- Brive-la-Gaillarde
  - Musée Labenche
- Tulle
  - Musée du Cloître de Tulle
- Sarran
  - Musée du Président Jacques Chirac
- Ussel
  - Musée du pays d'Ussel

=== 23 - Creuse ===
- Aubusson
  - Musée départemental de la tapisserie
- Guéret
  - Musée d'Art et d'Archéologie de Guéret

=== 24 - Dordogne ===
- Bergerac
  - Mémorial de la Résistance
  - Musée Donation Costi
  - Musée du tabac
  - Musée du Vin et de la Batellerie
- Cendrieux
  - Château de la Pommerie : Musée Napoléon
- Groléjac
  - Insectorama
- Les Eyzies-de-Tayac-Sireuil
  - Musée national de Préhistoire
- Saint-Pardoux-la-Rivière
  - Musée de la Carte postale en Périgord de 1898 à 1920.
- Sarlat
  - Musée automobile
- Terrasson-Lavilledieu
  - La Grange aux Dîmes de La Cassagne : Musée de lithographies, dessins et affiches de Sem

=== 33 - Gironde ===
- Bordeaux
  - Musée des Beaux-Arts
  - CAPC - Musée d'Art Contemporain
  - Musée National des douanes
  - Muséum d'histoire naturelle de Bordeaux
  - Musée des arts décoratifs et du design
  - Musée d'Aquitaine
- Cadillac
  - Musée de l'automobile de Cadillac
- La Réole
  - Musées de la Réole
- Lormont
  - Musée de l'assurance maladie
- Mérignac
  - Conservatoire de l'air et de l'espace de la BA 116

=== 40 - Landes ===
- Dax
  - Musée de l'aviation légère de l'armée de Terre et de l'hélicoptère
  - Musée de Borda
- Mont-de-Marsan
  - Musée Despiau-Wlérick

=== 47 - Lot-et-Garonne ===
- Agen
  - Musée municipal
- Aiguillon
  - Musée Raoul Dastrac
- Villeneuve sur Lot
  - Musée de Gajac

=== 64 - Pyrénées-Atlantiques ===
- Arudy
  - Maison d'Ossau
- Bayonne
  - Musée basque
  - Musée Léon-Bonnat
  - Musée basque et de l'histoire de Bayonne
- Biarritz
  - Asiatica - Musée d'Art oriental
  - Musée de la Mer
  - Musée du chocolat
  - Musée du Vieux-Biarritz
- Cambo-les-Bains
  - Musée Arnaga - Demeure d'Edmond Rostand
- Guéthary
  - Musée municipal Saraleguinea
- Hasparren
  - Musée Francis Jammes
- Hendaye
  - Musée d'Abbadie
- Morlanne
  - Château de Morlanne
- Nay
  - Musée du béret
- Orthez
  - Musée Jeanne d'Albret
- Pau
  - Musée national du château de Pau
  - Musée Bernadotte
  - Musée des Beaux-Arts
  - Musée des parachutistes de Pau
  - Musée de Pau ville anglaise
- Saint-Jean-de-Luz
  - Musée Grévin
- Saint-Faust
  - la Cité des Abeilles : musée consacré à l'abeille et à son environnement
- Salies-de-Béarn
  - Musée du Sel
  - Musée des arts et traditions béarnaises
- Sare
  - Musée du gâteau basque

=== 79 - Deux-Sèvres ===
- Oiron
  - Château d'Oiron

=== 86 - Vienne ===
- Châtellerault
  - Musée auto, moto, vélo
- Civaux
  - Musée archéologique de Civaux

=== 87 - Haute-Vienne ===
- Châteauponsac
  - Musée d'histoire et d'archéologie Réné Baubérot
- Limoges
  - Musée de l'Évêché
  - Musée national de Porcelaine Adrien Dubouché
- Rochechouart
  - Musée Départemental d'Art Contemporain

== Occitanie ==
=== 09 - Ariège ===
- Foix
  - Musée du château
- Lavelanet
  - Musée du textile et du peigne en corne
- Luzenac
  - Musée du talc
- Le Mas-d'Azil
  - Musée de la préhistoire
- Niaux
  - Musée pyrénéen
- Tarascon-sur-Ariège
  - Parc Pyrénéen de l'art préhistorique

=== 11 - Aude ===
- Limoux
  - Musée Petiet
- Carcassonne
  - Musée des Beaux-Arts de Carcassonne

=== 12 - Aveyron ===
- Coupiac
  - Musée de la marionnette
- Espalion
  - Musée du Scaphandre
  - Musée Joseph Vaylet
  - Musée du Rouergue :
    - Musée des Métiers de la Pierre et de la Vie rurale
    - Musée archéologique départemental de Montrozier
    - Musée des arts et métiers traditionnels
- Saint-Léons
  - Micropolis (La Cité des Insectes)
- Rodez
  - Musée Denys-Puech
  - Musée Fenaille
  - Musée Soulages

=== 30 - Gard ===
- Alès
  - Musée du colombier
- Bagnols-sur-Cèze
  - Musée Albert-André
  - Musée Léon-Alègre
- Nîmes
  - Carré d'Art (Musée d'art contemporain)
  - Musée archéologique
  - Musée d'histoire naturelle
  - Musée des Beaux-Arts
  - Musée du Vieux Nîmes
- Pont-Saint-Esprit
  - Musée d'Art sacré du Gard
- Rousson
  - Musée Le Préhistorama
- Uzès
  - Musée de l'agriculture et de la locomotion
  - Musée du bonbon

=== 31 - Haute-Garonne ===
- Aurignac
  - Musée de la Préhistoire
- Bagnères-de-Luchon
  - Musée du pays de Luchon
- Martres-Tolosane
  - Musée archéologique
- Muret
  - Musée Clément Ader
- Saint-Gaudens
  - Musée municipal d'Art et d'Histoire
- Saint-Frajou
  - Musée de Peinture de Saint-Frajou
- Toulouse
  - Musée Georges-Labit
  - Musée des Augustins
  - Museum d'Histoire Naturelle
  - Musée d'art moderne et contemporain Les Abattoirs
  - Le château d’eau, pôle photographique de Toulouse
  - Cité de l'espace
  - Hôtel d'Assézat (Fondation Bemberg)
  - Musée du Vieux Toulouse
  - Musée de l'Affiche
  - Musée Départemental de la Résistance et de la Déportation
  - Musée Saint-Raymond (Musée des Antiques de Toulouse)
  - Musée Paul-Dupuy

=== 32 - Gers ===
- Auch
  - Musée des Jacobins
- Béraut
  - Musée d'Art Naïf
- L'Isle-Jourdain
  - Musée Européen d'Art Campanaire
- Lectoure
  - Musée Eugène Camoreyt

=== 34 - Hérault ===
- Agde
  - Musée agathois Jules Baudou
  - Musée de l'éphèbe
- Aniane
  - Musée vivant du roman d'aventures
- Bédarieux
  - Maison des arts
- Béziers
  - Musée des Beaux-Arts
  - Château de Raissac
  - Musée du Biterrois
- Bouzigues
  - Musée de l'Etang de Thau
  - Musée du Sapeur Pompier
- Cabrières
  - Les Vignerons de Cabrières
- Castelnau-le-Lez
  - Centre Régional d'Histoire de la Résistance et de la Déportation
- Cazedarnes
  - Musée de l'Abbaye de Fontcaude
- Cazouls-lès-Béziers
  - Salle du Patrimoine
- Courniou
  - Musée Français de la Spéléologie
- Cruzy
  - Musée de Cruzy
- Faugères
  - Ecomusée l'Oustal des Abeilles
- Fraisse-sur-Agout
  - Pailher de Prat d'Alaric
- Frontignan
  - Musée de Frontignan
- Gignac
  - Musée de l'Hydraulique
- Hérépian
  - Musée de la Cloche et de la Sonnaille
- Lattes
  - Musée archéologique
- Lavérune
  - Musée Municipal Hofer-Bury
- Le Crès
  - Maison du Patrimoine
- Les Matelles
  - Musée Municipal de Préhistoire
- Lodève
  - Musée Fleury
- Loupian
  - Chapelle Saint-Hippolyte
- Marseillan
  - Musée de la Halle aux Oiseaux
- Marsillargues
  - Musée Paul Pastre
- Magalas
  - Espace Vins et Campanes
- Mèze
  - Musée du Parc de la Plaine des Dinosaures
- Minerve
  - Musée d'Archéologie et de Paléontologie du Minervois
  - Musée Hurepel
- Montpellier
  - Agropolis
  - Musée Languedocien
  - Musée Fabre
  - Musée Empereur Antonin ou Musée des Moulages
  - Musée d'Anatomie
  - Musée de la Pharmacie
  - Musée Atger
  - Musée du vieux Montpellier
- Murviel-lès-Béziers
  - Musée Archéologique
- Nissan-lez-Enserune
  - Musée de l'Oppidum
  - Musée Paroissial
- Olargues
  - Musée d'Histoire Locale
- Olonzac
  - Musée Archéologique du Minervois
- Palavas-les-Flots
  - Musée Albert Dubout
  - Musée du Petit Train
- Pézenas
  - Musée de Vulliod Saint-Germain
- Quarante
  - Musée Archéologique
- Saint-Gervais-sur-Mare
  - Maison Cévenole des Arts et Traditions Populaires
- Saint-Guilhem-le-Désert
  - Musée Lapidaire
- Saint-Jean-de-Fos
  - Vitrines de Poteries
- Saint-Pons-de-Thomières
  - Musée de Préhistoire Régionale
- Sérignan
  - Musée de l'Attelage et du Cheval
  - Musée d'art contemporain
- Sète
  - Musée Paul Valéry
  - Espace Georges Brassens
- Viols-en-Laval
  - Village Préhistorique de Cambous
- Viols-le-Fort
  - Exposition permanente de préhistoire du pic Saint-loup

=== 46 - Lot ===
- Cahors
  - Musée Henri Martin
  - Musée de la résistance, de la déportation et de la libération du Lot
  - Musée du vin et de la table Lotoise
- Figeac
  - Musée Champollion

=== 48 - Lozère ===
- Albaret-Sainte-Marie
  - Plus petit musée du monde
  - Géoscope de l'aire de la Lozère
- Banassac
  - Musée archéologique de Banassac
- Châteauneuf-de-Randon
  - Musée du Guesclin
- Javols
  - Musée archéologique de Javols
- Langogne
  - Filature des Calquières
  - Musée d'art sacré
- Le Pont-de-Montvert
  - Écomusée du mont Lozère
- Saint-Chély-d'Apcher
  - Musée de la métallurgie
  - Musée des papillons

=== 65 - Hautes-Pyrénées ===
- Bagnères-de-Bigorre
  - Musée Salies

=== 66 - Pyrénées-Orientales ===
- Céret
  - Musée d'Art Moderne de Céret
- Collioure
  - Musée d'Art Moderne Fonds Peské

=== 81 - Tarn ===
- Albi
  - Musée Toulouse-Lautrec
- Andillac
  - Château-Musée du Cayla
- Castres
  - Musée Goya

=== 82 - Tarn-et-Garonne ===
- Auvillar
  - Musée du Vieil Auvillar
  - Musée de la Batellerie
- Ginals
  - Beaulieu-en-Rouergue Abbey, housing a museum of contemporary art
- Montauban
  - Musée Ingres
  - Musée d'Histoire Naturelle Victor-Brun
  - Musée du Terroir
  - Musée de la Résistance et de la Déportation
  - Musée Marcel Lenoir

== Pays de la Loire ==
=== 44 - Loire-Atlantique ===
- La Baule
  - Musée aéronautique de la Côte d'Amour
- La Planche
  - Musée de la chanson française
- Le Loroux-Bottereau
  - Musée de la Vigne et du Vin de l'Abbaye de Sainte-Radegonde
- Nantes
  - Musée d'histoire de Nantes - Château des ducs de Bretagne
  - Musée des Beaux-Arts
  - Musée Dobrée (archéologie)
  - Musée naval Maillé-Brézé (Site officiel)
  - Musée Compagnonique
  - Musée de l'imprimerie
  - Jules Verne Museum
  - Muséum d'histoire naturelle de Nantes
- Le Pallet
  - Musée du vignoble Nantais
- Saint-Nazaire
  - Écomusée de Saint-Nazaire

=== 49 - Maine-et-Loire ===
- Angers
  - Galerie David d'Angers
  - Musée des Beaux-Arts
  - Musée Jean Lurçat et de la tapisserie contemporaine
  - Musée Régional de l'Air d'Angers-Marcé
  - Muséum d'histoire naturelle d’Angers
  - Musée du Génie militaire (Ouverture en 2008)
- Beaufort-en-Vallée
  - Musée Joseph Denais
- Cholet
  - Musée d'Art et d'Histoire
- Montsoreau
  - Château de Montsoreau-Museum of Contemporary Art
- Saint-Lambert-du-Lattay
  - Musée de la Vigne et du Vin d'Anjou
- Saumur
  - Musée des Blindés
  - Musée du moteur
- Trélazé
  - Musée de l'Ardoise

=== 53 - Mayenne ===
- Ambrières-les-Vallées
  - Musée des tisserands : history of chanvre, main culture in the Maine became Mayenne, in an authentic housse of tisserands from the 17th century.
- Beaulieu-sur-Oudon
  - Musée de la moisson : tout le matériel ancien et l'ambiance des moissons d'autrefois.
- Château-Gontier
  - Musée d'Art et d'Archéologie Hôtel Fouquet
- Chémeré-le-Roi
  - Moulin de Thévalles : moulin à eau sur quatre niveaux, 1850.
- Cossé-le-Vivien
  - Musée Robert Tatin
- Denazé
  - Musée de la vieille forge : le métier de forgeron, in a house from the 17th century.
- Fontaine-Couverte
  - Moulin des gués : moulin à vent de type angevin à 3 étages, 1824.
- Grez-en-Bouère
  - Moulin de la Guénaudière : moulin cavier.
- Juvigné
  - Musée du moteur et de l'outil à la ferme : sur plus de 1200 m^{2}, plus de cent moteurs, tracteurs, batteuses... antérieurs aux années 1950.
- Lignières-Orgères
  - Musée des moteurs et de l'outillage
- Madré
  - Écomusée de Madré : une ferme mayennaise du début du siècle dernier.
- Melleray-la-Vallée
  - Musée du cidre : la récolte, la transformation, la production, les outils d'hier et d'aujourd'hui.
- Renazé
  - Musée de l'ardoise et de la géologie : sur l'ancien site ardoisier, toutes les étapes de l'exploitation autour d'un puits d'extraction.
- Saint-Ouën-des-Toits
  - Musée de la chouannerie et de la Révolution : dans la "closerie des poiriers", l'ancienne maison de Jean Cottereau dit Jean Chouan, l'histoire de ce personnage, de la Choaunnerie et de la paysannerie de 1750 à 1850.
- Sainte-Suzanne
  - Musée de l'auditoire : Sainte-Suzanne, cité médiévale, mille ans d'Histoire : maquettes, objets authentiques, armes du moyen-âge, et la plus ancienne armure conservée en France (1410–1420).
- Villaines-la-Juhel
  - Musée du pot au lait : Conservatoire de la laiterie fermière d'antan

=== 72 - Sarthe ===
- Le Mans
  - Musée automobile de la Sarthe

=== 85 - Vendée ===
- La Roche-sur-Yon
  - Musée Municipal
  - Musée SIMCA Yonnais
- Mouilleron-en-Pareds
  - Musée des Deux Victoires - Clemenceau - De Lattre
- Les Sables-d'Olonne
  - Musée de l'Abbaye Sainte-Croix
- Talmont-Saint-Hilaire
  - Musée automobile de Vendée

== Provence-Alpes-Côte d'Azur ==
=== 04 - Alpes-de-Haute-Provence ===
- Barcelonnette
  - Musée de la Vallée
- Digne-les-Bains
  - Musée Alexandra David-Néel
- Digne-les-Bains
  - Musée Alexandra David-Néel

=== 05 - Hautes-Alpes ===
- Aiguilles
  - Musée du Vieux Queyras

=== 06 - Alpes-Maritimes ===
- Antibes
  - Musée d'archéologie
  - Musée naval et napoléonien
  - Musée Peynet et du dessin humoristique
  - Musée Picasso
- Beaulieu-sur-Mer
  - Villa grecque Kérylos Fondation Théodore Reinach
- Biot
  - Musée national Fernand Léger
- Breil-sur-Roya
  - Écomusée du haut-pays nicois
- Cagnes-sur-Mer
  - Château musée Grimaldi
  - Musée Renoir
- Cannes
  - Musée de la Castre
  - Musée de la Mer
  - La Malmaison
- Grasse
  - Musée d'Art et d'Histoire de Provence
  - Musée international de la Parfumerie
  - Musée de la Marine
  - Villa Musée Jean-Honoré Fragonard
- Menton
  - Jean Cocteau Museum
  - Musée de préhistoire régionale
- Mougins
  - Musée de l'automobile
  - Musée d'Art Classique de Mougins
- Nice
  - Musée d'art moderne et d'art contemporain
  - Musée des arts asiatiques
  - Musée des Beaux-Arts
  - Musée international d'Art naïf Anatole Jakovsky
  - Musée de la marine
  - Musée Matisse
  - Musée national Message Biblique Marc Chagall
  - Musée de paléontologie humaine de Terra-Amata
  - Muséum d'histoire naturelle
- Saint-Paul-de-Vence
  - Fondation Maeght
- Tende
  - Musée des Merveilles
- Vallauris
  - Musée de la céramique
  - Musée national Picasso « La Guerre et la Paix »
- Villefranche-sur-Mer
  - Musée d'Art et d'Histoire
  - Musée Volti
- Villeneuve-Loubet
  - Musée Escoffier de l'art culinaire

=== 13 - Bouches-du-Rhône ===
- Aix-en-Provence
  - Musée Granet
  - Atelier de Cézanne
  - Musée Paul Arbaud
  - Musée des tapisseries
  - Musée de Pavillon de Vendôme-Dobler
  - Musée du Vieil-Aix
  - Museum d'Histoire Naturelle Aix-en-Provence
- Allauch
  - Musée du vieil Allauch
- Aubagne
  - Musée de la Légion étrangère
- Arles
  - Musée de l'Arles et de la Provence antiques
  - Museon Arlaten
  - Musée Réattu
- Gréasque
  - Musée de la Mine - Pôle Historique Minier
- La Barque
  - Musée provencal des transports de La Barque
- Marseille
  - Musée d'archéologie méditerranéenne
  - Musée d’Arts Africains, Océaniens, Amérindiens
  - Musée d'art contemporain de Marseille
  - Musée des Beaux-Arts
  - Mémorial des camps de la mort
  - Musée des Civilisations de l'Europe et de la Méditerranée
  - Musée Cantini
  - Musée des docks romains
  - Musée de la faience
  - Mémorial national de la France d'outre-mer
  - Musée Grobet-Labadié
  - Marseille History Museum
  - Muséum d'histoire naturelle de Marseille
  - Musée de la Marine
  - Musée de la Mode
  - Musée de la moto
  - Musée du Santon
  - Galerie des Transports
  - Musée du Vieux Marseille
- Martigues
  - Musée Ziem
- Mallemort
  - Musée des engins du batiment et des travaux publics
- Puyloubier
  - Musée de l'uniforme légionnaire

=== 83 - Var ===
- Bendor
  - Universal Exposition of Wines and Spirits
  - Ricard Museum of Advertising Objects
- Embiez
  - Paul Ricard Oceanographic Institute
- Saint-Cyr-sur-Mer
  - Musée gallo-romain de Tauroentum
- Saint-Tropez
  - Musée de l'Annonciade
  - Musée d'Archéologie sous-marine
- Sanary-sur-Mer
  - Musée Frédéric Dumas
- Toulon
  - Musée d'Art
  - Musée des arts asiatiques
  - Musée national de la Marine

=== 84 - Vaucluse ===
- Apt
  - Cathédrale Sainte-Anne
  - Musée d'histoire et d'archéologie
- Avignon
  - Fondation Calvet
  - Musée lapidaire
  - Musée Requien
  - Palais des Papes
- Carpentras
  - Musée Comtadin-Duplessis
  - Musée Sobirats
- Fontaine-de-Vaucluse
  - Musée d'histoire 1939-1945 - L'Appel de la Liberté

== Réunion ==
- Saint-Paul
  - Musée de Villèle

== See also ==
=== See also ===
- Tourism in France
- Culture of France

== Sources ==
Guide Dexia of the 10 000 museums and private collections in France, Dom-Tom, Andorre et Monaco by Alain Morley and Guy le Vavasseur, Cherche-Midi Editeur, 2001
