= Musée Pierre-Noël de Saint-Dié-des-Vosges =

French museum

Coordinates: 48.28853°N 6.95120°E

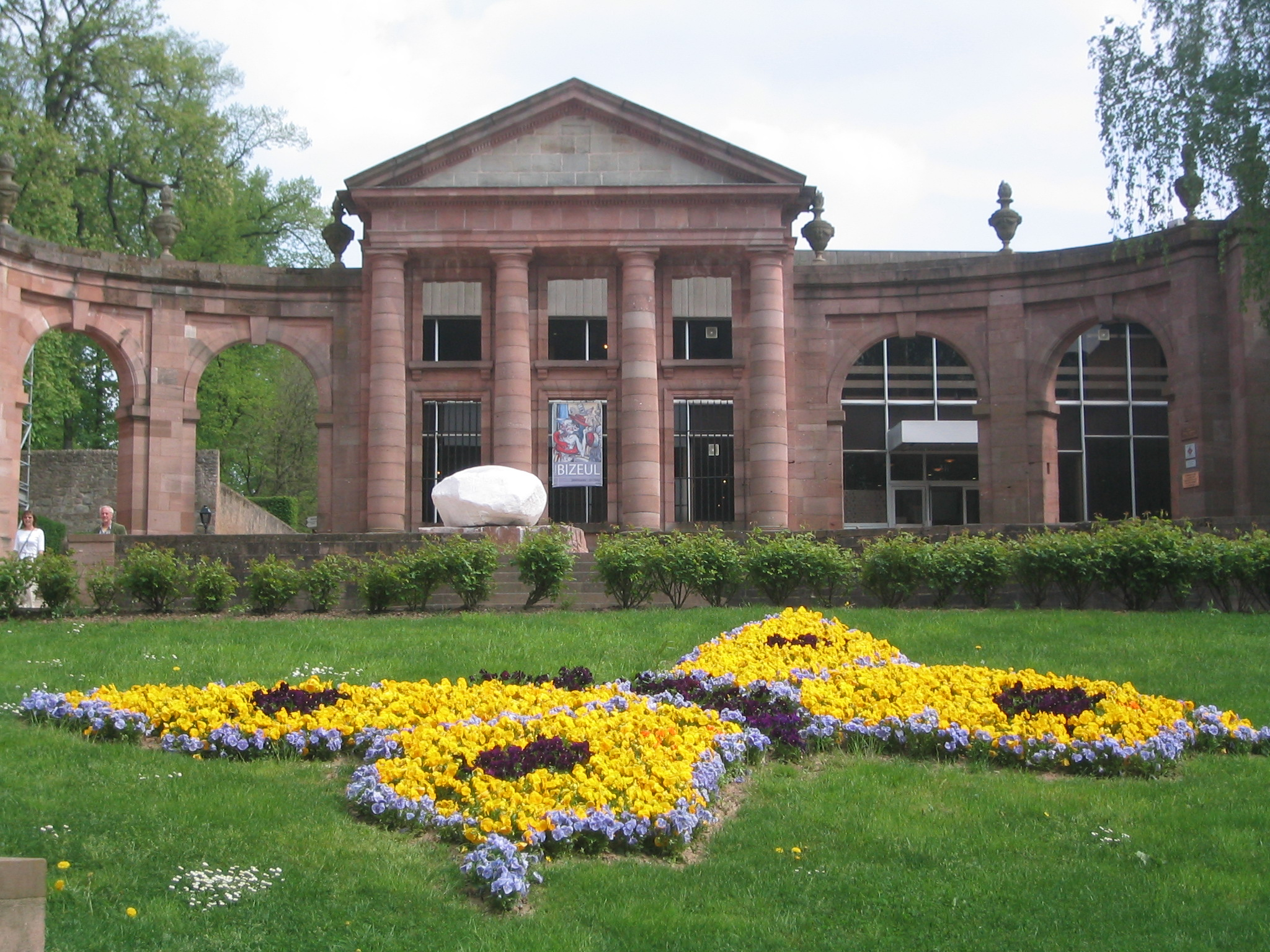
The entrance of the museum.

The Musée Pierre-Noël is an art and history museum located in Saint-Dié-des-Vosges. Designated as a Museum of France, it is named after Pierre Noël, the mayor of the city from 1965 to 1977. An inscription engraved on the modern part of the building recalls its original purpose, "museum of life in the High Vosges," but the collections now also feature a significant focus on contemporary art.

== History ==
Since the construction of the museum in 1977, the colonnade of the former episcopal palace built on the north side of the cathedral by architect Jean-Michel Carbonnar in 1782 provides access to this new space.

The medieval part is located on the side of Rue Saint-Charles, to the right of the main entrance. There, visitors can discover a covered staircase, the last vestige of the walls once built to consolidate the terrain of the church district created on the Mont, which notably provided access to an arm of the Meurthe, diverted since then. A breach in this wall was made in 1781 during the construction of the episcopal palace.

The vast modern building opened to the public in 1977 incorporates this old staircase, classified as a historical monument like the colonnade.

This new building, completed between 1973 and 1976, is the work of Aldo Travaglini, an architect who arrived in Saint-Dié in 1947. Outside, the three faux-relief panels (Promenade in a park, The Banquet, and The movement towards knowledge) were designed by Françoise Malaprade.

Albert Ronsin directed the Museum and the Library from 1960 to 1990, while also writing a series of books devoted to the history of the city.

== See also ==
- List of museums in France
