= Musée du Pays de Hanau =

Museum in Bouxwiller, France

Coordinates: 48°49′34″N 7°29′01″E

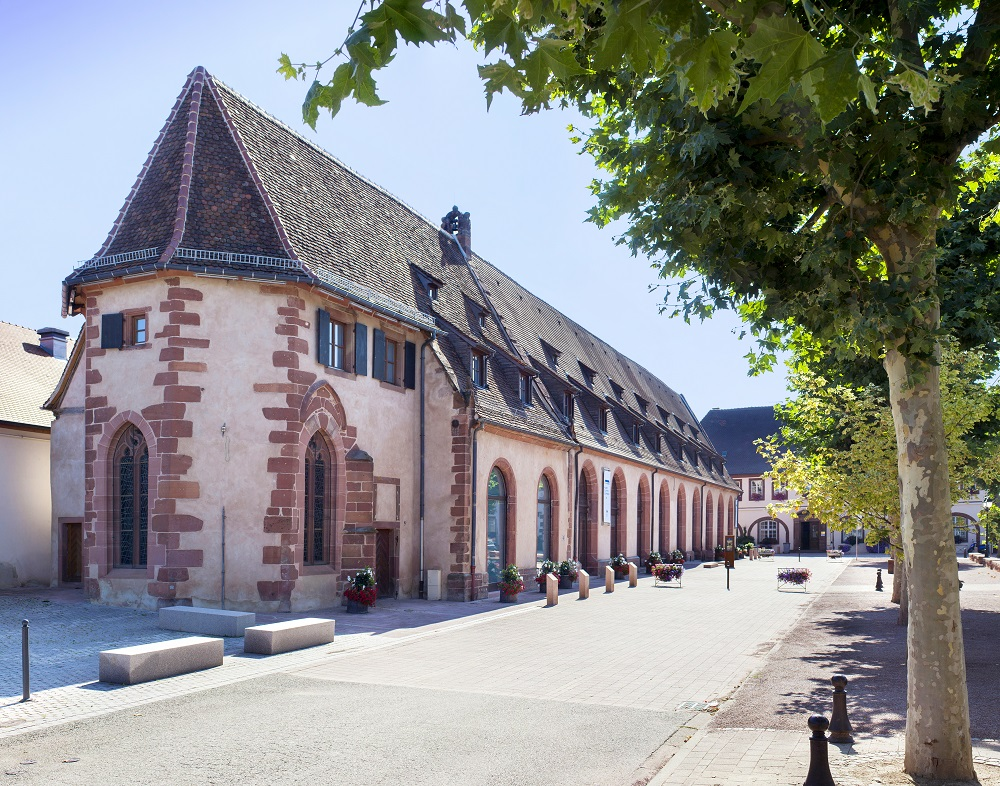
- Established: 1933
- Location: Bouxwiller (Bas-Rhin), Paris, France
- Website: https://www.museedupaysdehanau.eu/pays-hanau-museum/

Musée du Pays de Hanau is a museum in Bouxwiller in the Bas-Rhin department of France.

== History ==
The museum was created in 1933 under the leadership of Thieling Gauthier, professor at the College of Bouxwiller. He was supported by the mayor at the time, Charles Gall. The same year, the Association des Amis du Musée (Friends of the Museum) was created to support the museum. It is currently (2023) chaired by Alain Janus.

The purpose of the museum is to present to the public the history of Bouxwiller and the former county of Hanau-Lichtenberg. Originally, the museum occupied the building of the chancery which has acted as the City Hall since the Revolution. From 2010 to 2013, the museum was closed to the public. During this period the inventory reserves (about 2,000 pieces) were re-presented in an area of 1,000 m^{2} (11,000 sq ft) in the Halle aux Blés (wheat market) and the former chapel of the Château de Bouxwiller. The cost of this project was €4,514,000. This new museum, of regional scope, benefits from the Musée de France label and aims for of 10,000 to 14,000 visitors per year.

== Buildings ==
The castle chapel was built against the defensive wall in the 14th century, with a half-hexagonal apse to the east and a barrel vault. It was dedicated to St George. In the 16th century the market hall was built outside the enceinte. It may have housed the castle's orange trees in winter. Following the French Revolution, the castle was demolished with the exception of these two buildings, which now form a single free-standing range. In the 2010-13 renovations, the historic structure of the buildings was re-exposed, with two new 'basket' structures alluding to the commercial history of the site.

== Exhibitions ==
The museum is divided into four main sections. The former chapel covers the last inhabitants of the castle in the 18th century. The upper floor explores the history of the county and people of Hanau-Lichtenberg. In the old market hall, the environment and geology of the area are explained. The final room compares the fine art and folk traditions in the museum's collection.

== See also ==
- List of museums in France
