= Maison des Rochers de Graufthal =

Three semi-troglodyte rock houses in France

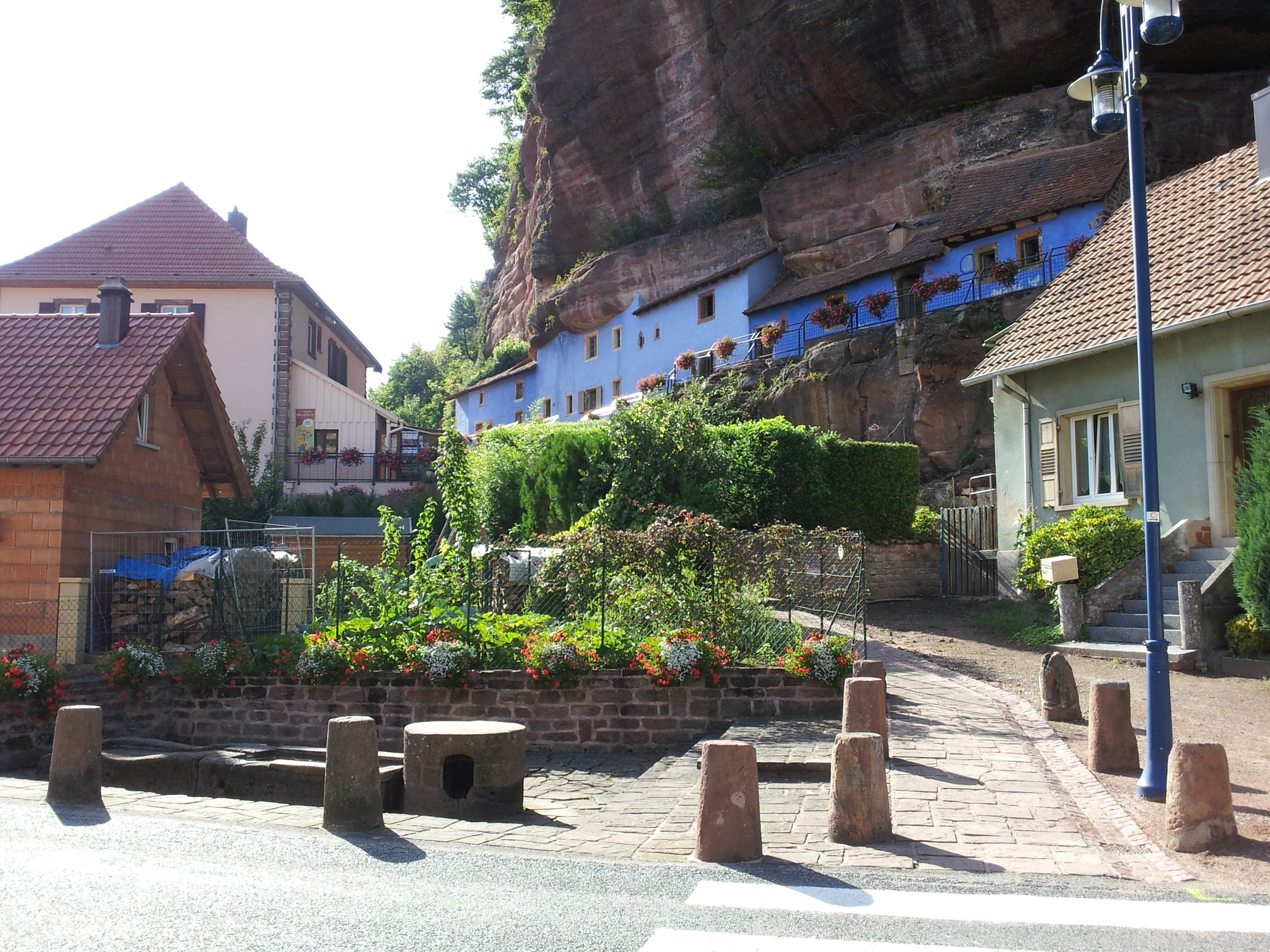

- Location within France
- Established: 1988; 38 years ago
- Location: Graufthal, Eschbourg, Alsace, France
- Coordinates: 48.81993°N 7.28009°E
- Type: Historical buildings
- Website: www.maisonsdesrochers-graufthal.fr

The Maison des Rochers is located in the hamlet of Graufthal in the Eschbourg commune of the department of Bas-Rhin, France. These three semi-troglodyte rock houses were restored and refurbished with furniture and mementos of the past in 1958. They were included in the supplementary inventory of historical monuments in 1988. Today they are maintained by an association dedicated to their development, and are open to visitors.

== History ==
The archaeologist Robert Forrer began to excavate the site in 1899. He found that they were used for storage in the Middle Ages. The rock cavities helped reduce the area of walls and roofs to be maintained. Forrer, who was assisted by Charles Spindler, deduced the presence of the warehouses or granaries from posts whose positions were still visible from holes in the rocks. The first makeshift houses may be dated by a sandstone lintel with the date 1760. They would have been converted into more solid houses in the eighteenth century.

The anachronistic rock houses were already drawing crowds by the start of the twentieth century. In 1931 the ground floor ceiling of the Weber house collapsed, and the 88-year-old owner died soon after. The Ottermann sisters continued to live in their house. Madeleine, the eldest, died in 1947 aged 89. Catherine, called "Felsekaeth", lived another 11 years. The houses lost their last occupant when Catherine Ottermann died in 1958. They were listed as a historical monument on 20 December 1988.

== Buildings ==
The houses are set into rock shelters in red sandstone cliffs. There are two sets of buildings in two horizontal rock shelters, reached by a footpath. The houses are in the first rock shelter, about 7 metres (23 ft) above the village street. A match factory is located in the upper rock shelter.

The buildings are built into the rock, with rubble masonry, and are partially covered with tile roofs where they are not fully protected by the rock ceiling. They are roughly built, with rudimentary internal partitioning.

The houses have the same internal layout. On the ground floor there is a kitchen beside the room where the parents would have lived, and a stable with unplastered walls. Above that is a second floor holding a dormitory for the children and a hayloft and granary. Catherine Ottermann told the tourists that her house had hosted up to eighteen occupants at the same time. The kitchen is shared by two houses.

== Gallery ==
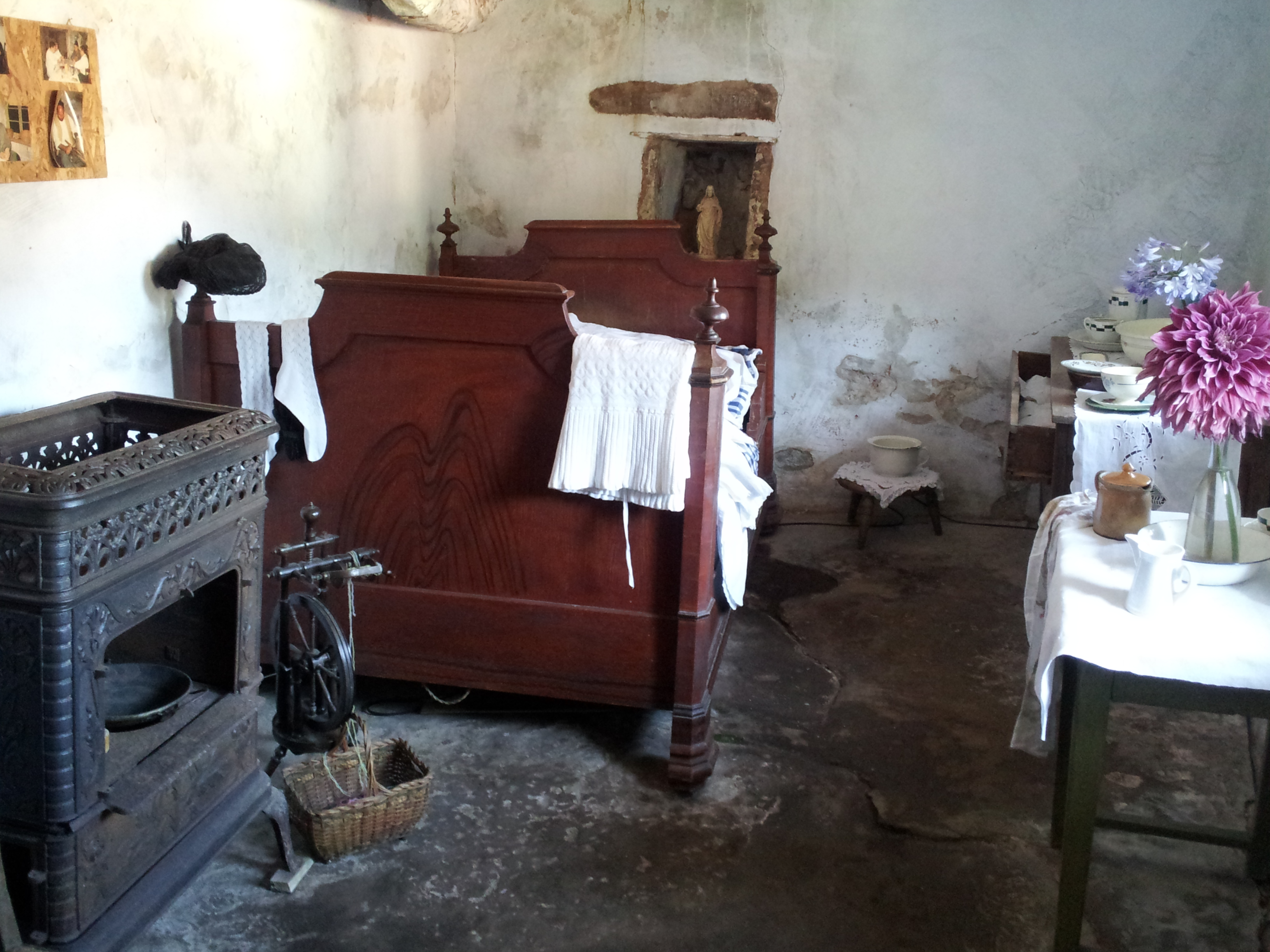
Room of Catherine Ottermann

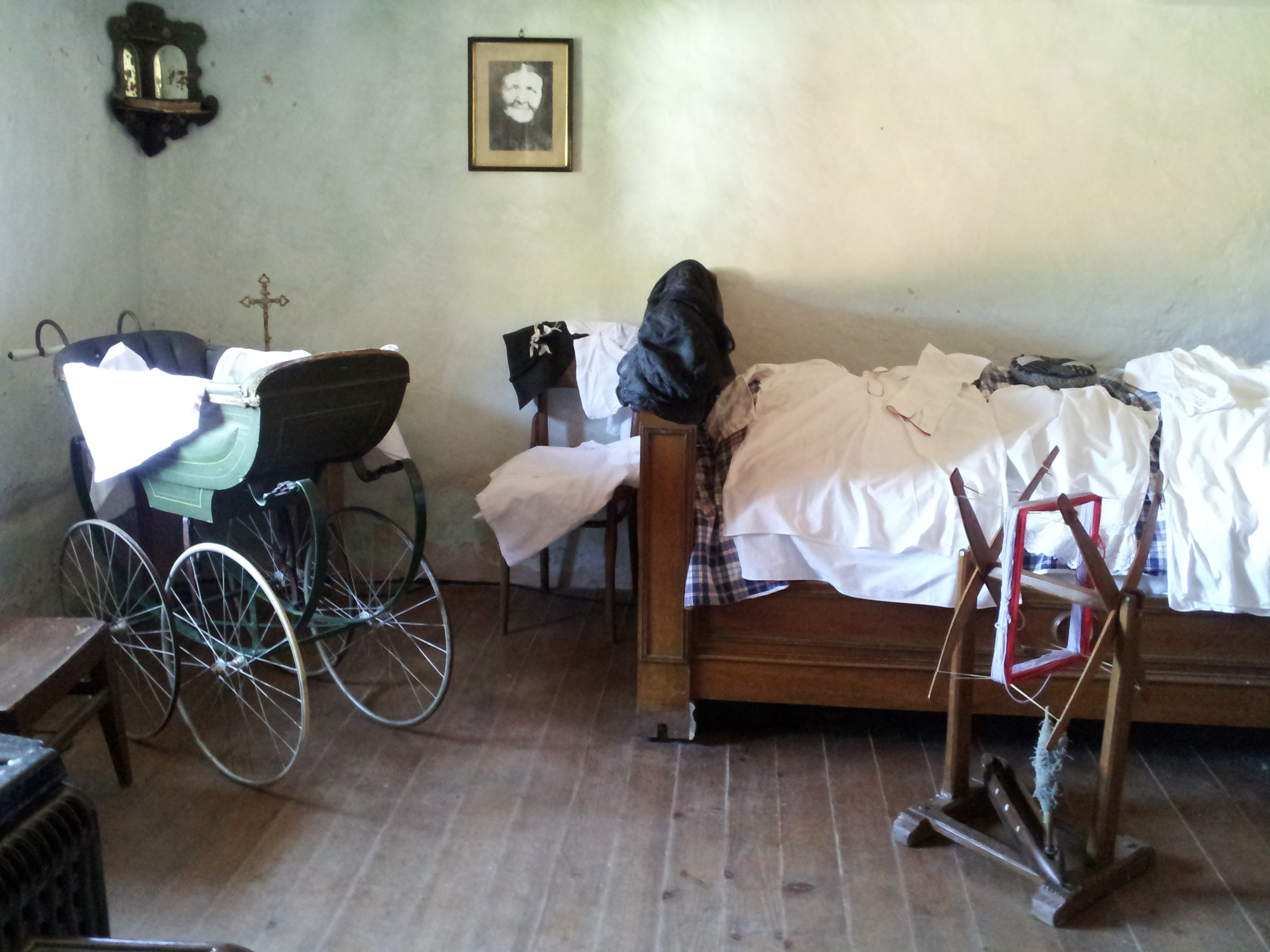
Room

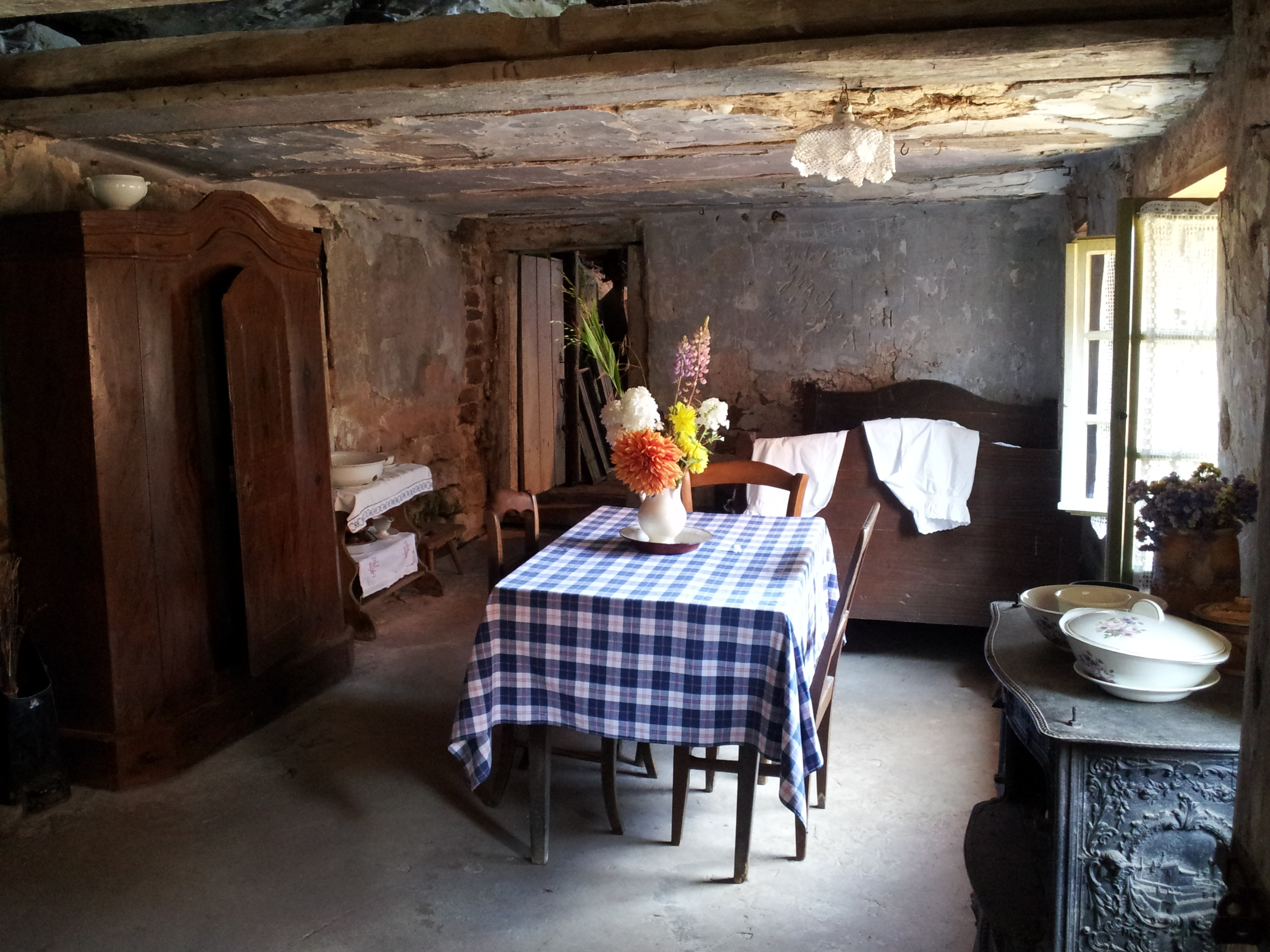
"Stub" (living room) of the Weber family

== Notes and references ==
Citations

Sources

- Braun, Markus (2012). "Les Maisons des Rochers – Eschbourg". Journal des Spectacles.
- "Historique – Les maisons des rochers". Maisons des Rochers de Graufthal.
- "maisons troglodytiques". Ministry of Culture, France.
- "Maisons troglodytiques de Graufthal : les éléments bâtis". Ministry of Culture, France.
