= Musée Verger-Tarin =

Museum in Autun, France

Coordinates: 46.9441°N 4.2998°E

The Musée Verger-Tarin is a museum in Autun, France.

== History ==
In 1475, Cardinal Rolin constructed a building between two pre-existing walls to accommodate altar boys and their masters. The place was later occupied by sub-chanters, and in 1791, the street was named after it. In 1791, the building belonged to a certain Jossier and then changed hands frequently. During the Restoration, the local commander of the National Guard, Chevalier Pasquier, acquired it. In 1845, Louise-Philiberte Verger-Tarin, the widow of Pierre Verger and niece of Chevalier Pasquier, inherited the residence five years after her husband's death. She had three children, including a daughter who left the residence upon marriage. The two boys, Victor and Henri, lived with their mother until her death and later became co-owners of the building. Neither of them married. Victor was highly regarded and worked as a steward managing over a hundred estates.

In 1913, following Victor's death, the hotel passed to his eldest niece Marie Bachelet, who had no descendants. On May 8, 1933, to secure her future and preserve her household items, she sold her property, including its walls and furniture, to the Société Eduenne in the presence of a notary, retaining the right to live there. She died in 1939, and the Eduenne Society converted the building into a museum.

In 1954, the city acquired ownership. The museum was abandoned and repurposed as a storage facility. In 1980, a meticulous reorganization took place. In 2001 and 2002, it served as the venue for guided and night tours organized by a local theater company, Arc-en-Scène. Since then, the building has sustained significant damage, including the collapse of the kitchen ceiling. As of 2011, the museum remains closed to the public.

== Sources ==
- Denis Grivot, Autun, Lescuyer, Lyon 1967, p.319
- Jean Berthollet, Catalogue du Musée Verger-Tarin d'Autun, Dejussieu, Autun, 1947
- Harold de Fontenay, Autun et ses monuments, Dejussieu, Autun, 1899, p.407

== See also ==
- List of museums in France
