= Gérard de Berny =

French politician

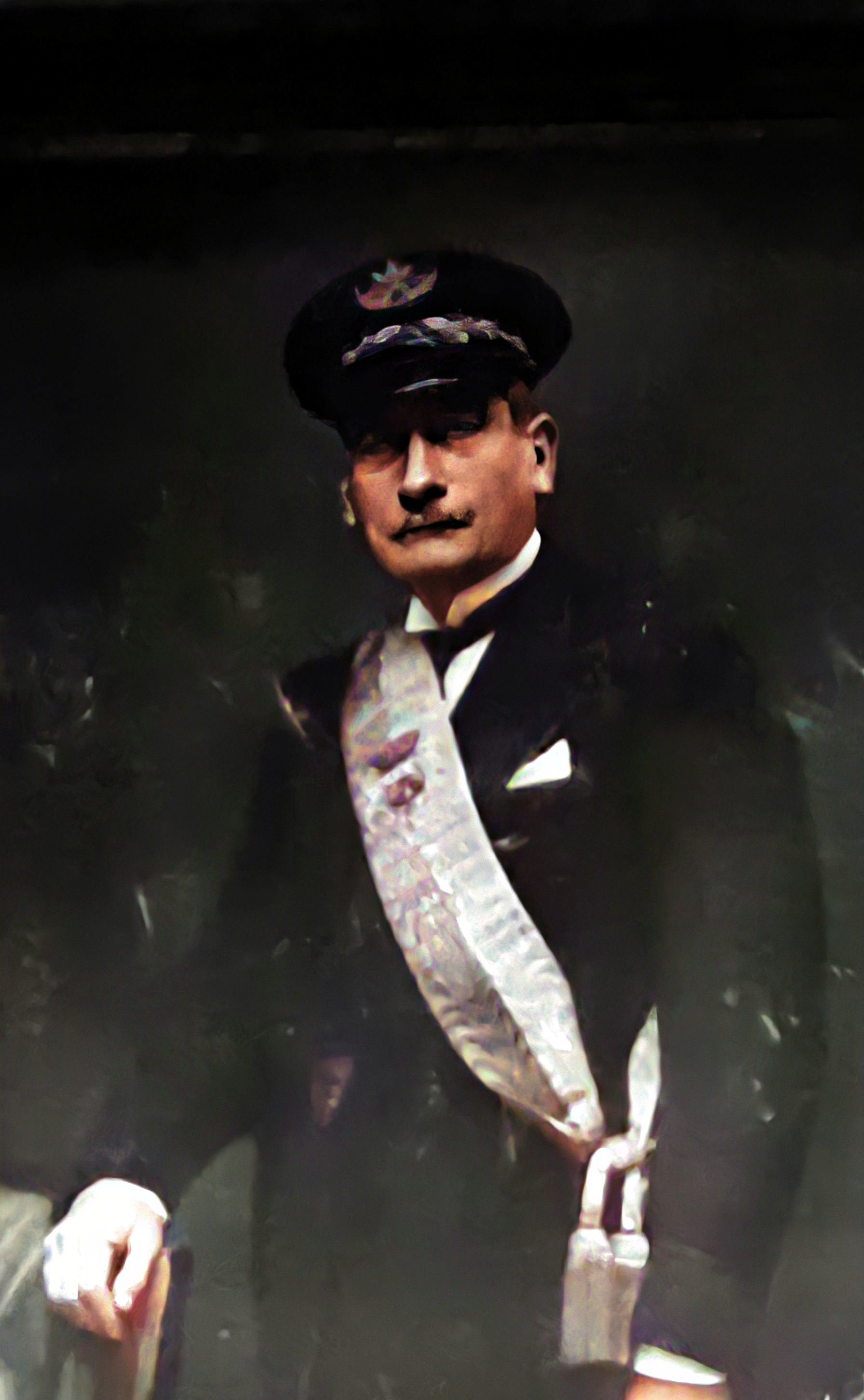
Gérard de Berny

Roger Louis Gérard de Berny (18 February 1880 – 21 December 1957) was a French politician of the French Third Republic.

He was born in Amiens and died in his hôtel on Rue Victor Hugo in Amiens, now the Hotel de Berny Museum. He was elected senator for the Somme in January 1936 and was one of those who voted to give full power to Marshal Pétain on 10 July 1940. de Berny did not return to government after the Second World War.

== Sources ==
- Sénat français. "Anciens sénateurs IIIème République : de BERNY Gérard". senat.fr.
- "Gérard de Berny", dans le Dictionnaire des parlementaires français (1889–1940), sous la direction de Jean Jolly, PUF, 1960
