= Écomusée vosgien de la brasserie =

Museum and brewery in Ville-sur-Illon, Vosges, France

Coordinates: 48°11′0″N 6°12′19″E

Écomusée vosgien de la brasserie is a museum and brewery in Ville-sur-Illon, Vosges, France. It was built by Jacques Lobstein in 1887.
