= List of museums in Normandy =

List of the museums in Normandy, France:

- Bayeux Tapestry Museum
- Château-musée de Dieppe
- Écomusée de la Basse Seine
- Maison de l’armateur
- Musée Alfred Canel
- Musée Alphonse Georges Poulain
- Musée Biochet-Bréchot (Maison des templiers)
- Musée d’Évreux - Ancien évêché
- Musée de l’Ancien Havre
- Musée de l’horlogerie
- Musée de la Céramique de Rouen
- Musée de la marine de Seine
- Musée des Antiquités (formerly Musée départemental des Antiquités)
- Musée départemental Pierre Corneille
- Musée départemental Victor Hugo
- Musée des Arts et de l’Enfance
- Musée des Beaux-Arts de Bernay
- Musée des Beaux-Arts de Rouen
- Musée des instruments à vent
- Musée des Ivoires
- Musée des sapeurs pompiers de France
- Musée des Terre-Neuvas et de la Pêche
- Musée des Traditions et Arts Normands
- Musée du Prieuré de Graville
- Musée du Prieuré de Harfleur
- Musée du Verre, de la Pierre et du Livre
- Musée Flaubert et d’histoire de la médecine
- Musée industriel de la Corderie Vallois
- Musée Le Secq des Tournelles (Ferronnerie)
- Musée Louis-Philippe
- Musée Malraux
- Musée Mathon-Durand
- Musée maritime fluvial et portuaire de Rouen
- Musée municipal d’Elbeuf
- Musée municipal de Barentin
- Musée municipal de Lillebonne
- Musée municipal de Louviers
- Musée national de l’Éducation
- Musée Nicolas Poussin
- Musée Pierre Corneille
- Muséum d’Histoire Naturelle de Rouen
- Muséum d’Histoire Naturelle du Havre
- Overlord Museum
- Pavillon Flaubert
