= Maison des Arts (Bischwiller) =

Museum in France

Coordinates: 48.7662°N 7.8612°E

Maison des Arts (French for: "House of Arts") is a museum in Bischwiller in the Bas-Rhin department of France. It is situated in a 17th-century house that was built for a farrier.

== See also ==
- List of museums in France
