= Musée de la Folie Marco =

Museum in Barr, France

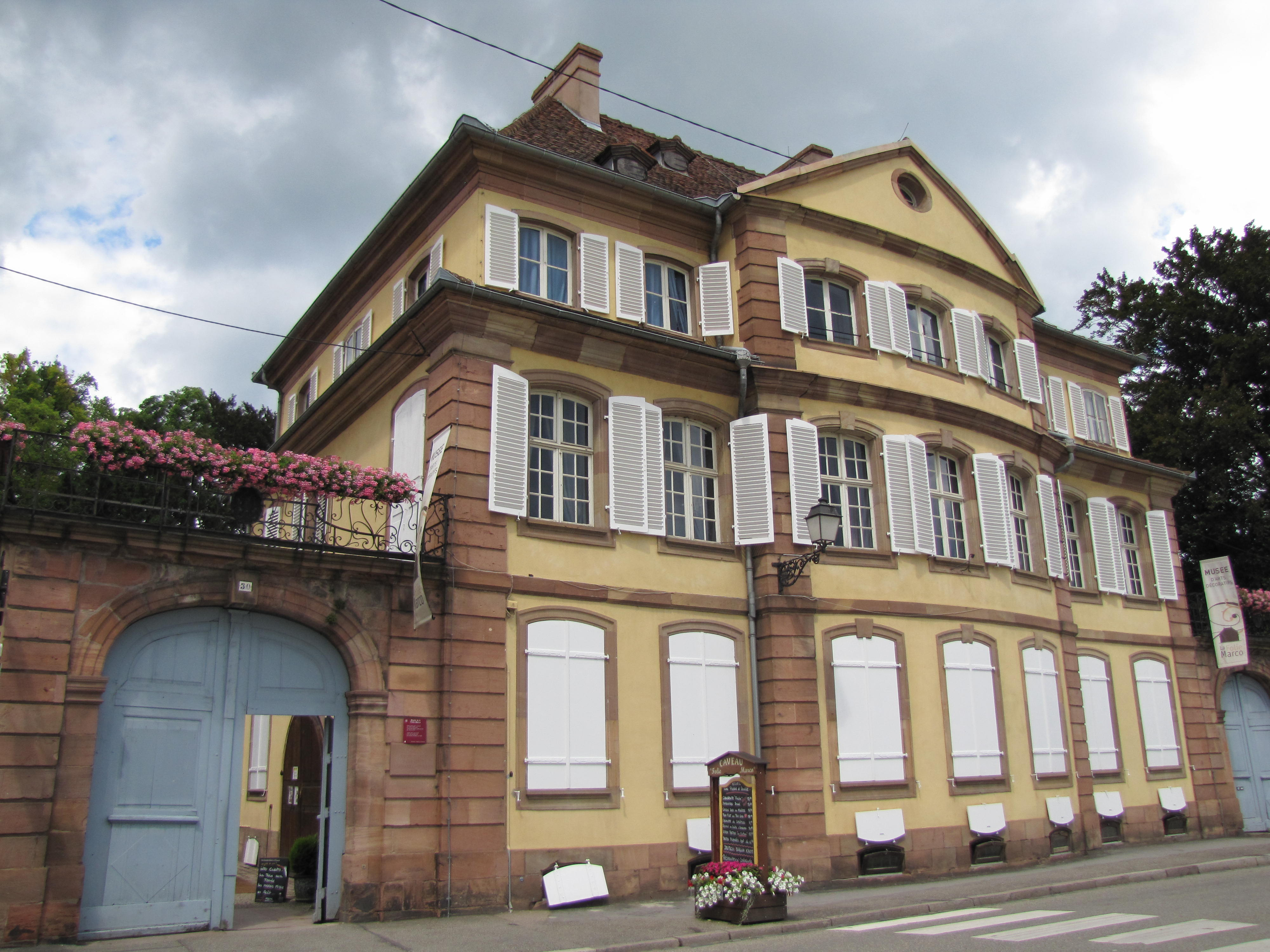
- Location: France
- Coordinates: 48°24′37″N 7°27′04″E
- Website: www.musee-foliemarco.com
- Location of Musée de la Folie Marco

Musée de la Folie Marco is a museum in Barr in the Bas-Rhin department of France.

== See also ==
- List of museums in France
