= Musée de la Laub =

Museum in Bischwiller in the Bas-Rhin department of France

Coordinates: 48.768°N 7.8595°E

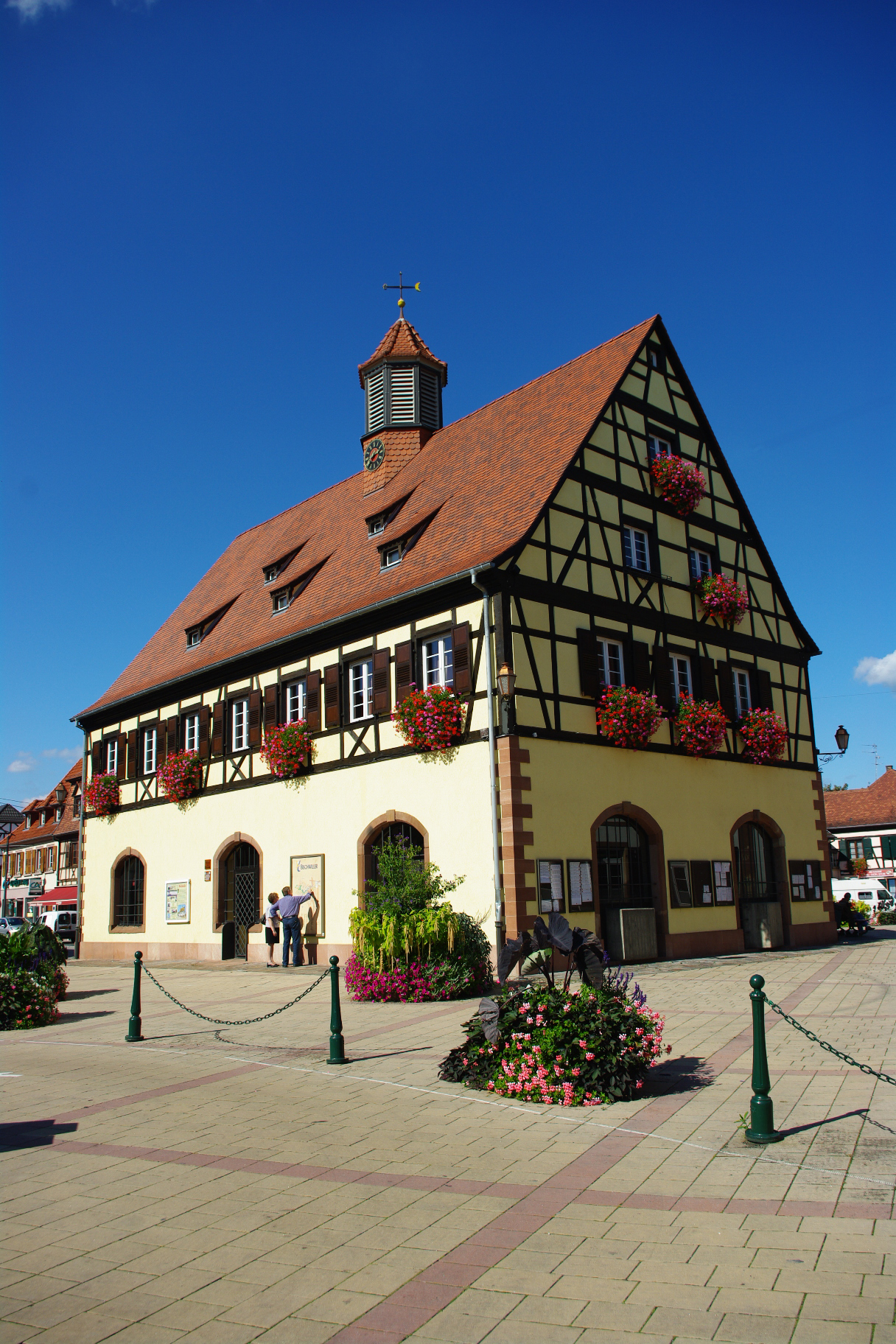

Musée de la Laub is a museum in Bischwiller in the Bas-Rhin department of France. Built in 1665 under Duke Christian II de Birkenfeld Bischwiller, it was the centre of village life until the 20th century. It became the town hall in 1912 and housed the village fire service until 1986.

== See also ==
- List of museums in France
