= Hotel de Berny Museum =

History museum in Amiens, France

Coordinates: 49°53′34″N 2°18′11″E

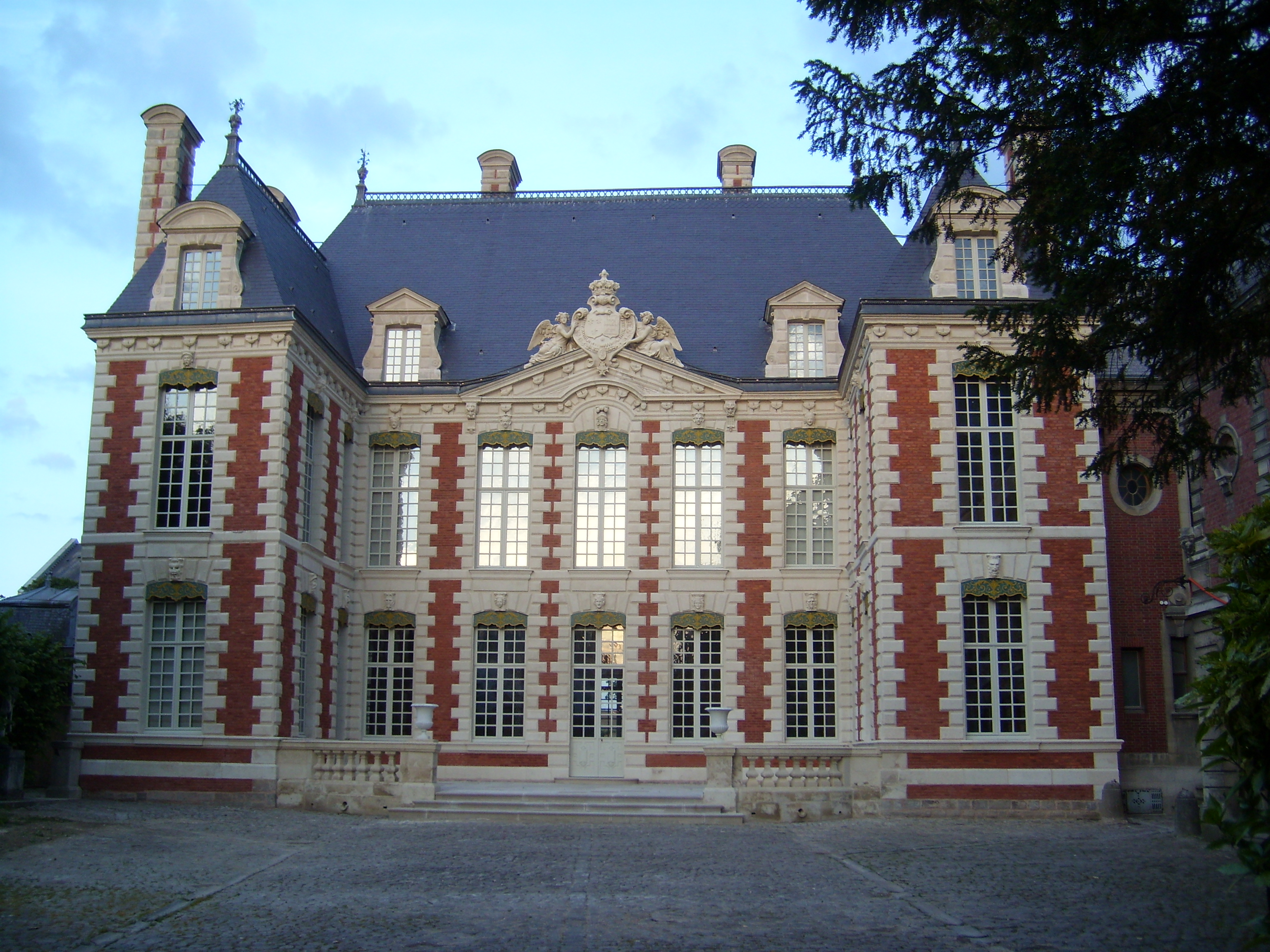

The Hotel de Berny Museum (French: Musée d'art local et d'histoire régionale or Musée de l'Hôtel de Berny) is a local history museum for the region of Picardy. It is located in Amiens. It is currently closed for building works. It is a Museum of France.

== History ==
It was established when in 1957 Gérard de Berny left the city of Amiens his hôtel particulier, its surrounding buildings and his collection of art and Louis XV and Louis XVI furniture signed by François Foliot (le Jeune), Sené père and Pierre Roussel. He was a former senator for the Somme region. The hôtel is in the Louis XIII style in brick and stone, with a large main lodge and two pavilions behind it, built between 1633 and 1634 for the Treasurer of France for the generality of Picardy. In 1790 that office was suppressed and the hôtel sold off to become a private house. It was rebuilt in the 19th century under the Second French Empire by the marquis de Landreville to designs by the architect Antoine - the frères Duthoit also redecorated its interior.

== Collections ==
This includes 18th century tapestries and wood carvings, such as those from the La Fayette salon in the château de La Grange-Bléneau and those by the Huet brothers (Nicolas, François and Jean-Baptiste the Younger, the three sons of Jean-Baptiste Huet) and Adrien Choquet (a painter from Abbeville) from the Salon du Zodiaque in the Long château, as well as Art Nouveau and Art Deco ceramics by Montières, French Revolution-era faïence, paintings by Louis Jean François Lagrenée and Isabey, a 1612 harpsichord, pastels by Choderlos de Laclos and 16th-20th century ironwork and clocks. It also contains objects relating to figures from local and national history such as Gresset, Choderlos de Laclos, Jules Verne, Édouard Branly and Maréchal Leclerc.

== Bibliography ==
- Albéric de Calonne, Histoire de la ville d'Amiens
- Ronald Hubscher, Histoire d'Amiens
- Xavier Bailly et Jean-Bernard Dupont (sous la direction de), Histoire d'une ville: Amiens, Amiens SCEREN (CNDP-CRDP), 2013
