= Museum of Antiquities (Rouen) =

Museum in Rouen, France

Coordinates: 49.4470°N 1.0995°E

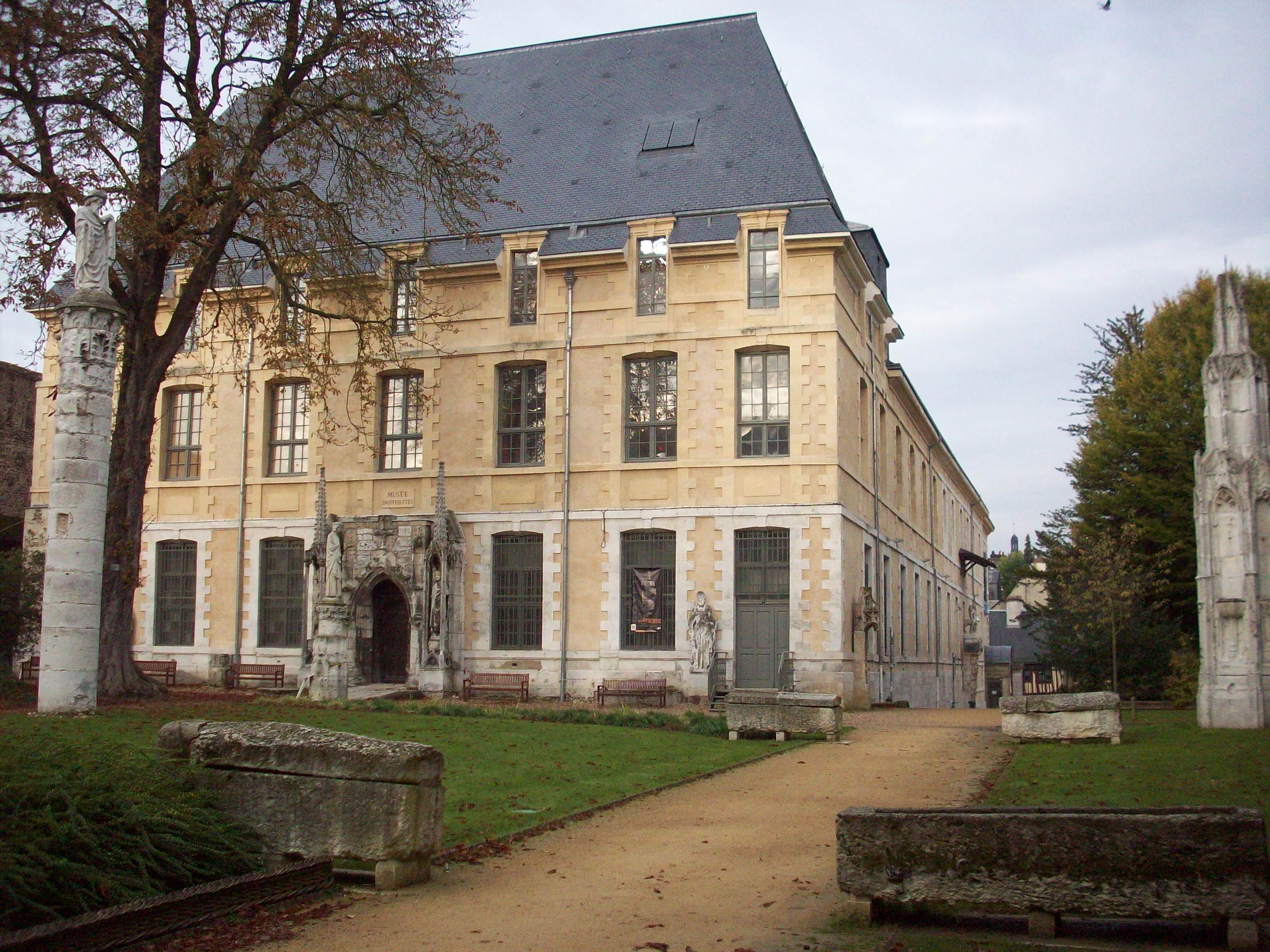

The Musée des Antiquités (known until around 2016 as the Musée départemental des Antiquités) is a museum in the French city of Rouen, housing archaeological finds from the department of Seine-Maritime. It is classified as a Museum of France.

It was set up in 1831 to house the finds excavated at Lillebonne at the instigation of prefect Henri Dupont-Delporte. Its first director was Achille Deville and one of its first curators was Jean Benoît Désiré Cochet. It suffered a fire on 21 April 1894.

On 1 January 2016, the museum moved to the Métropole Rouen Normandie and it now forms part of the Réunion des Musées Métropolitains Rouen Normandie network.
