= Musée Lapidaire Saint-Nicolas =

Archaeological museums in France

Coordinates: 46.9555°N 4.3004°E

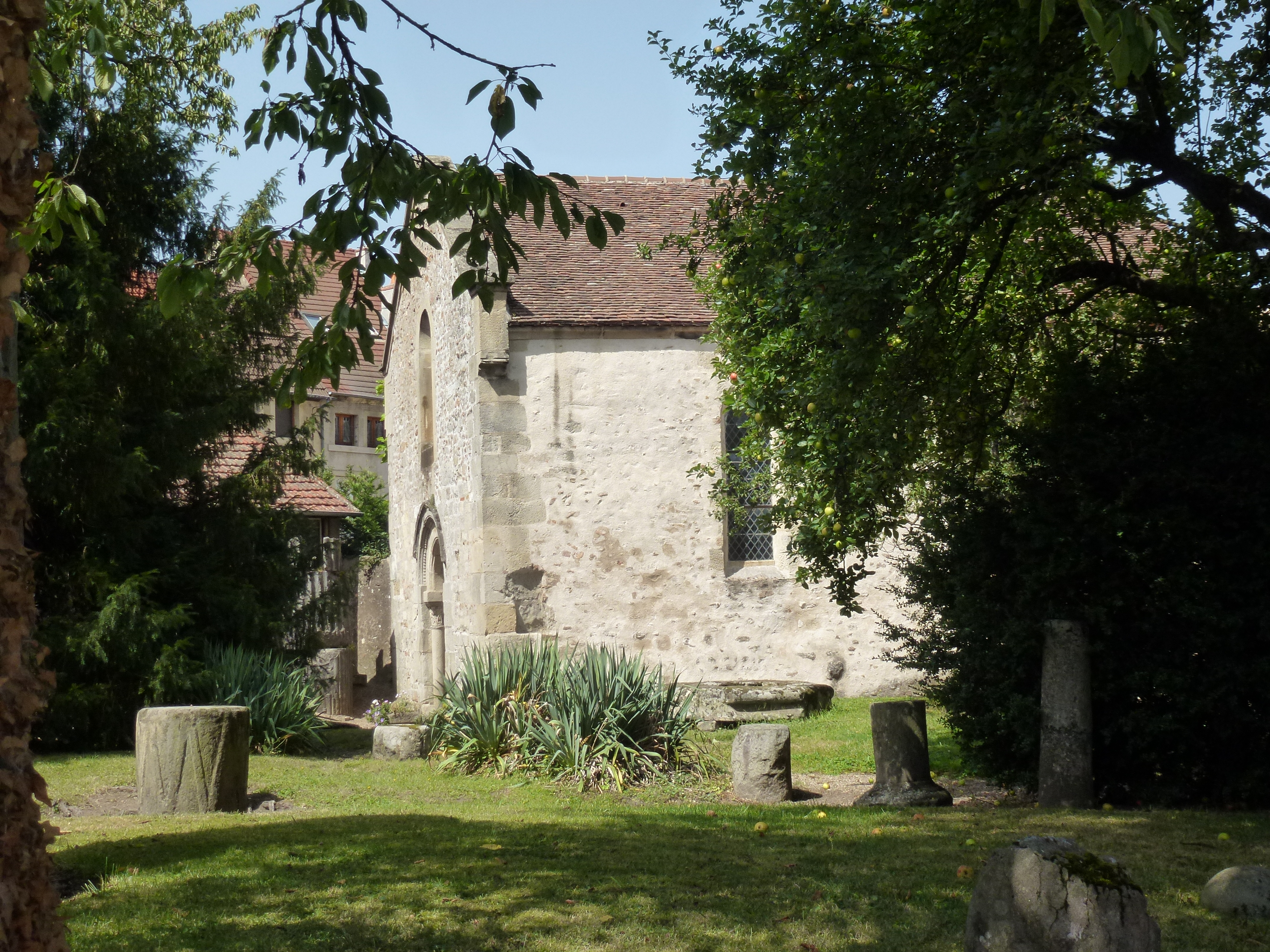
Saint Nicholas Chapel, Lapidary Museum

The Musée lapidaire Saint-Nicolas is an archaeological museum in Autun, France. It is housed in the former Saint-Nicolas chapel, dating from the 12th century.

== Collection ==
The museum brings together elements of Gallo-Roman architecture from Augustodunum (capitals, part of the aqueduct, cornices, fragments of fountains and columns). The size of certain columns gives a good idea of the imposing appearance of the disappeared monuments. A gallery of tombs presents an alignment of 130 stelas dating from the 1st to 4th centuries; some elements of medieval craftsmanship (statuary and sarcophagus) are also visible.

The romantic-inspired garden lends the place to sketches and torchlight lighting during the Night of the Museums.

== History ==
On 14 May 1811, Mayor George established a cabinet of antiquities within the College of Autun, compiling donations from private citizens and local figures. The collection was relocated to the college's infirmary in 1828, and later moved to dedicated exhibition rooms inside a newly constructed city hall in 1835. To systematically organize the growing collections, Mayor Laureau established the Société éduenne scholarly society on 4 February 1836 and entrusted it with the museum's management.

By 1845, the Maison des caves Joyaux—which now serves as the Roman theatre caretaker's house—was constructed to function as a lapidary museum. Due to chronic space shortages, additional objects were temporarily deposited at the sub-prefecture, and the collections were shifted between the gendarmerie and the former Cordeliers convent from 1858 to 1860.

In October 1860, Jacques Gabriel Bulliot proposed the current site for the museum. To fund the extensive construction required, a public subscription was launched in May 1861, drawing significant financial support from members of the Société éduenne, Bulliot himself, and a member of the Schneider family. This development led to the official creation of the Saint-Nicolas Lapidary Museum on 10 August 1861. The complex was expanded in 1876 with structural work in the chapel and the addition of a cloister featuring three-sided galleries and an interior garden. The final renovations were completed in the late 2000s, which included the hiring of a permanent caretaker.

== See also ==
- List of museums in France
