= Les Charmettes =

Historic house museum in Chambéry, France

Coordinates: 45°33′19.35″N 5°55′51.10″E

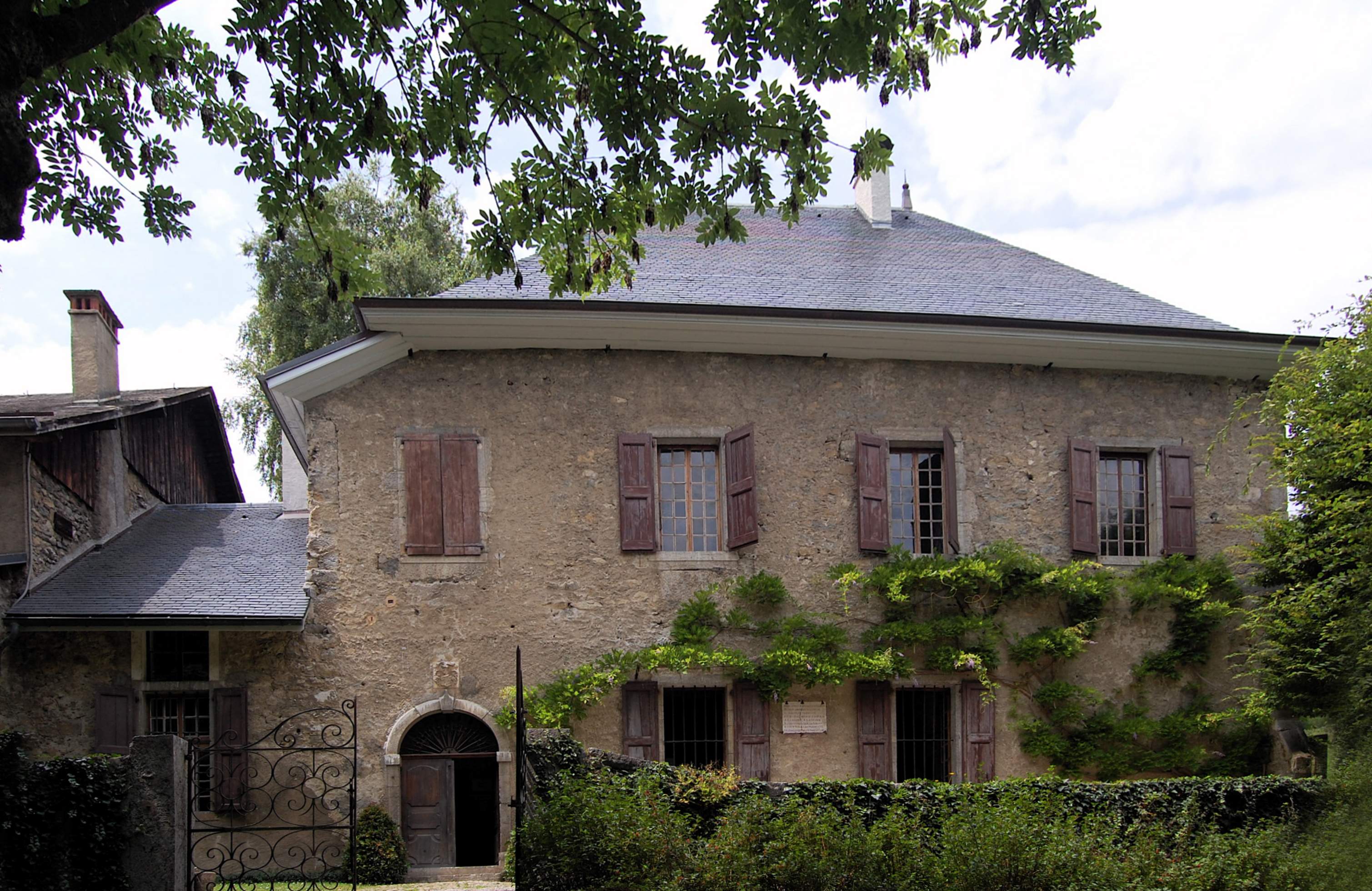
"Les Charmettes" outside of the French city of Chambéry (2007).

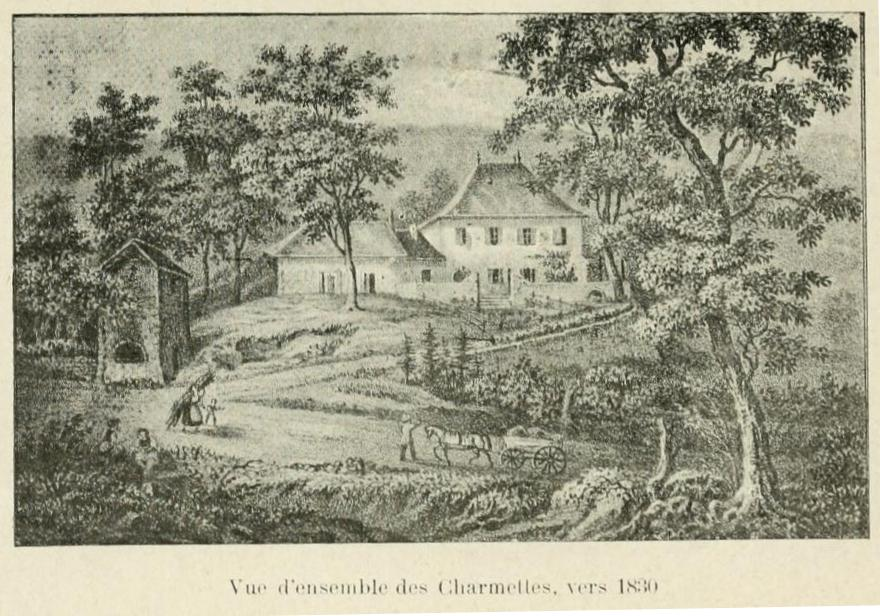
"Les Charmettes" around 1830.

Les Charmettes is writer's house museum in a hamlet near the town of Chambéry in the Savoie region of France. It is famed as a favourite retreat of the philosophe Jean-Jacques Rousseau (1712-1778).

== History ==
In 1728, a young Jean-Jacques Rousseau fled a watch-making apprenticeship in nearby Geneva and took refuge with Françoise-Louise de Warens, or Madame de Warens, who became his mistress and mentor. They first resided in the city of Annecy before moving on to Chambéry. Madame de Warens - whom Rousseau affectionately referred to as maman (mother) - was 13 years Rousseau's senior. From the summer of 1736, Rousseau and maman moved into a country house called Les Charmettes in the neighborhood of Chambéry. Located in the hollow of a wooded valley, Les Charmettes figures prominently in Rousseau's Confessions (Books V and VI). According to him, his short sojourn at Les Charmettes constituted "the short period of my life's happiness" and was instrumental in the development of his love of nature and the simple country life. During the revolutionary and subsequent Romantic periods, Les Charmettes became a symbol of Rousseau's revolutionary thought as well as a shrine attracting such literary and political celebrities as George Sand and Alphonse de Lamartine. In 1905 Les Charmettes was classified an historical monument by the French government. The house and its grounds are now a museum open to the public.
