= Musée du Chapitre =

Museum in Épinal, Vosges, France

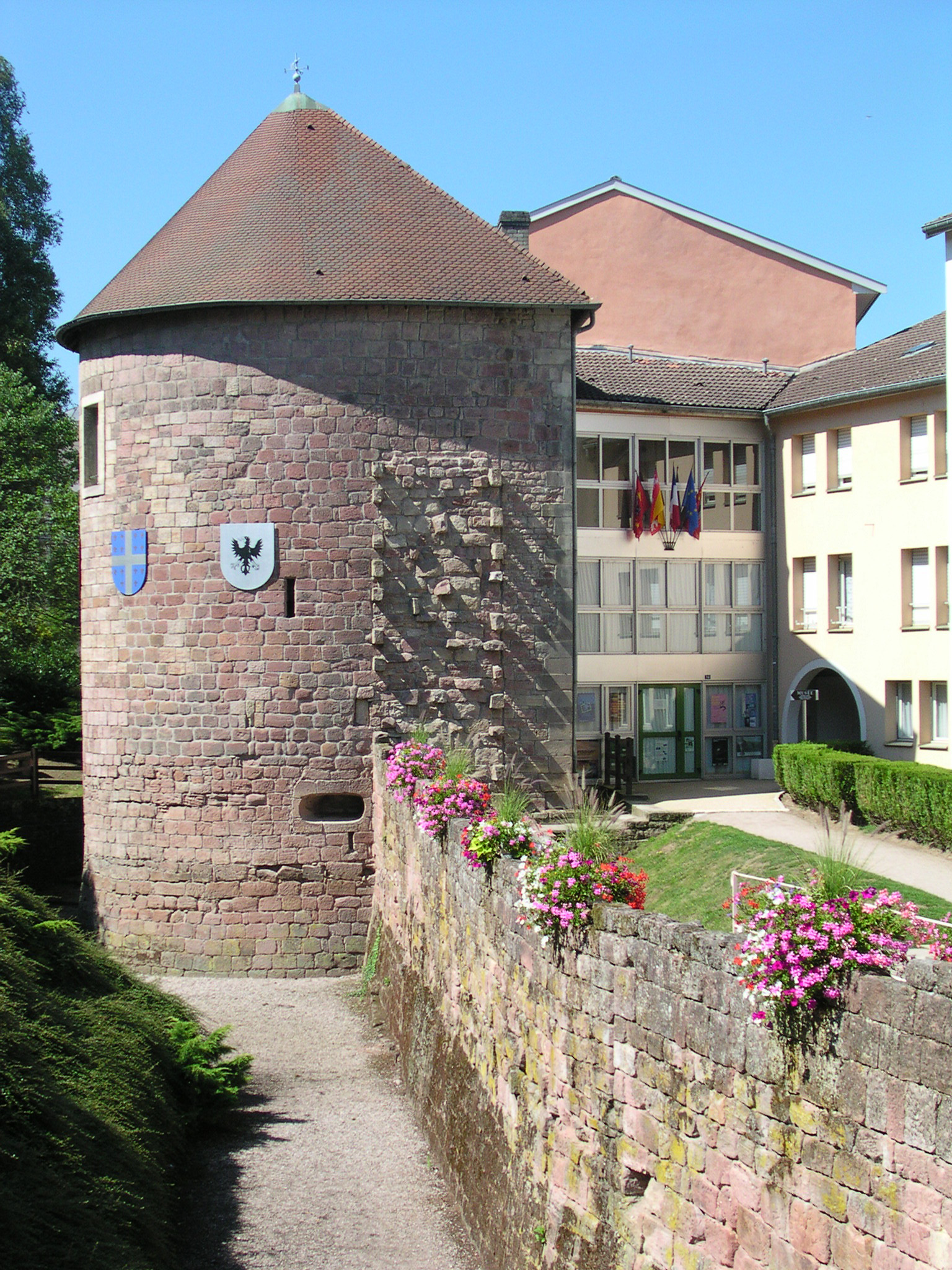

Musée du Chapitre is a museum in Épinal, Vosges, northeastern France. It is located within a medieval tower.

== Description ==
On the ground floor, Mr. Gnaedinger's model reproduces the famous painting by Nicolas Bellot, who painted the Spinalian city in 1626, on the order of the city, which wanted to have a cadastral-type plan, or have it noted by the Dukes of Lorraine, then “suzerains” of the Spinaliens, the work to be undertaken to restore the Moselle, the river which crosses Épinal. The rest of the exhibition is devoted to the evolutions of the city, evolutions presented in images.

The first floor is devoted to archaeological objects, testifying to the life of the Spinalians in the Middle Ages and in modern times, which have been found during the various excavations organized in Épinal over the past thirty years: cannonballs, architectural elements, everyday objects, etc.

As for the second floor, it welcomes the canonesses of Epinal, these noble ladies who marked the religious life of Spinal, and whose houses can still be admired in the rue du Chapitre, close to the museum.
