= Musée de la Lutherie et de l'Archèterie françaises =

Museum in Mirecourt, Vosges, France

Coordinates: 48.3015°N 6.1356°E

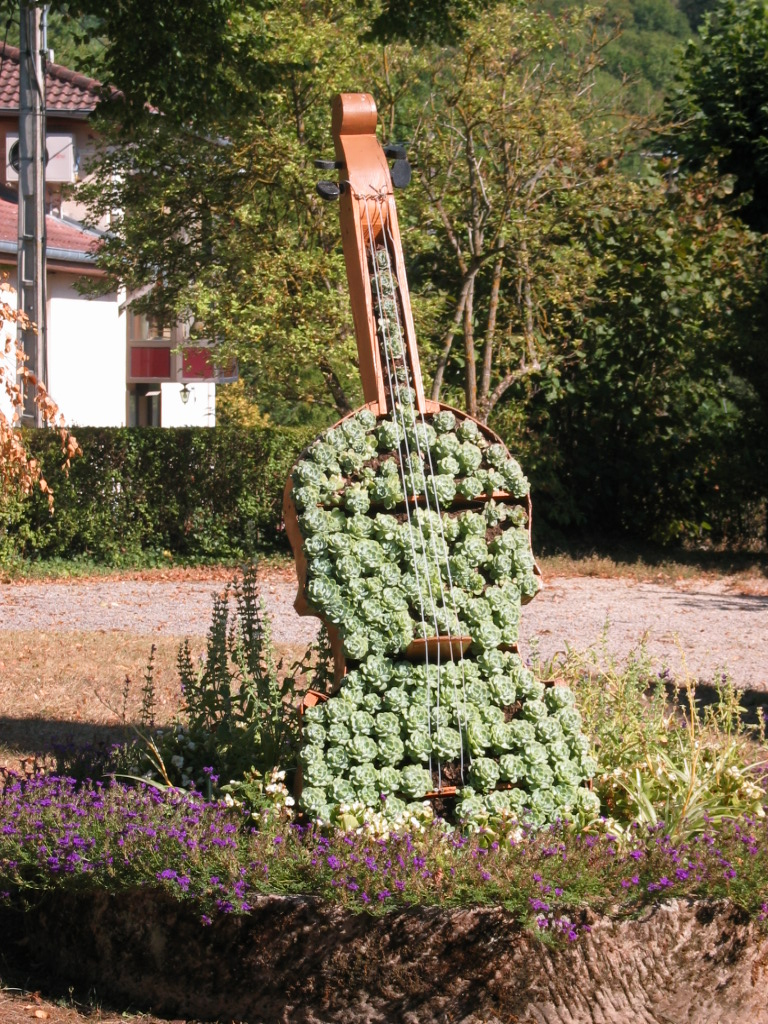

Musée de la Lutherie et de l'Archèterie françaises is a museum in Mirecourt, Vosges, France. It is dedicated to the history of violin making.

== See also ==
- List of music museums
