= Musée de l'image =

Museum in Épinal, Vosges, France

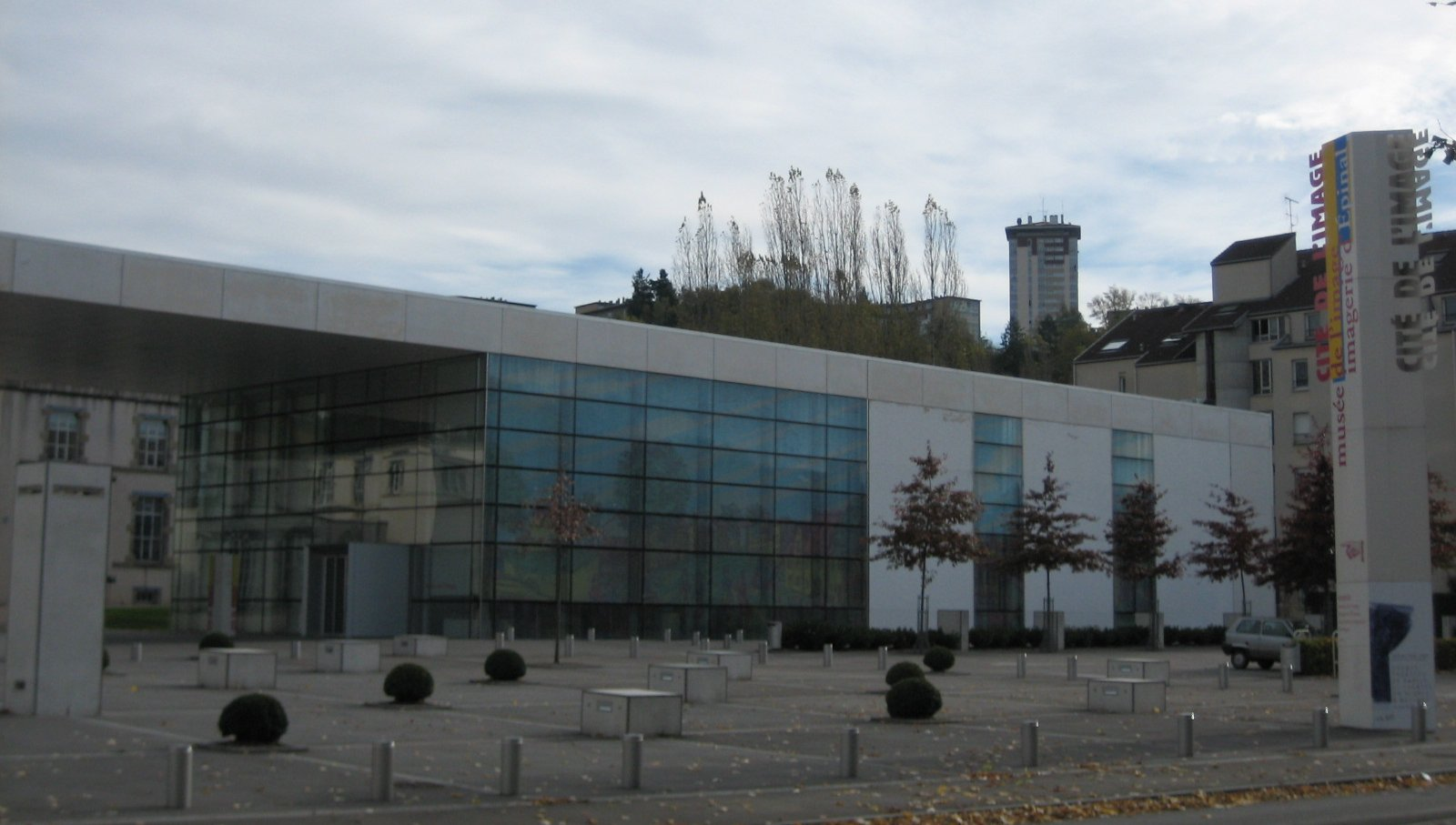

The Musée de l'image is a museum in Épinal, Vosges, France. It contains over 110,000 images. The museum houses one of the most important collections of popular French and foreign images from the 17th century to the present day.

== Building ==
Inaugurated on May 3, 2003, the Musée de l'Image, which faces the Moselle, is housed in a contemporary building whose glass facade suggests a "village festival", a gigantic fresco made up of a host of small images. It was designed by Repérages Architecture (Adeline Rispal and Jean-Jacques Raynaud), associated with Jean-Luc Gérard and the Sigma design office. With a span of 2,000 m2, the Musée de l'Image d'Épinal "frames" the Pellerin factory, witness to the epic of the image makers and thus integrates it as an object of the museum. The Pellerin factory — founded in 1796 and today called Imagery of Épinal — completes the “Cité de l'Image” site. The original goal was to leave the technical aspect for the visit of the Imagery when the historical and cultural aspect, the knowledge and the reading of the image in particular, were apprehended in the museum.

The north wing of the museum houses the administration, the documentation center and the public service. While the south wing includes reception, exhibition rooms and reserves. There is a passage between the Musée de l'Image and the Imagerie, used today only for people with reduced mobility to enter the imagery. In front of the museum, an esplanade includes a car park separated by plant barriers.

Conceived from the outset to be a museum of images and not of imagery — even if this area was of great interest given the presence of numerous images in Lorraine — the Musée de l'Image is a municipal museum.
