= Eschbourg =

- Commune
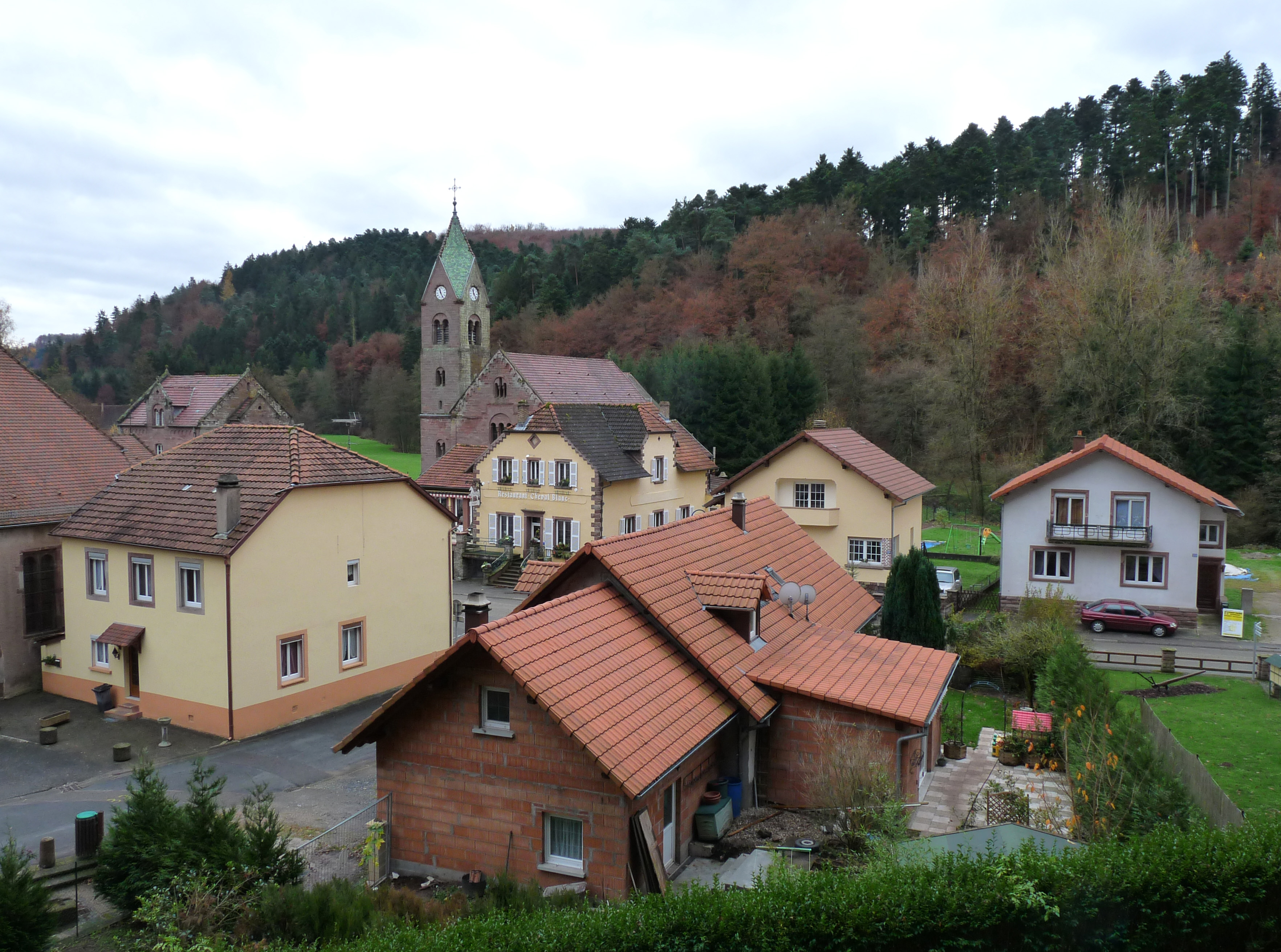
- A general view of Graufthal in Eschbourg

- Coat of arms
- Location of Eschbourg
- Location within France Location within Grand Est
- Coordinates: 48°48′48″N 7°17′47″E
- Country: France
- Region: Grand Est
- Department: Bas-Rhin
- Arrondissement: Saverne
- Canton: Ingwiller
- Intercommunality: Hanau-La Petite Pierre

Government
  - Mayor (2020–2026): Etienne Wagner
- Area^{1}: 14.05 km^{2} (5.42 sq mi)
- Highest elevation: 387 m (1,270 ft)
- Lowest elevation: 192 m (630 ft)
- Population (2023): 455
  - Density: 32.4/km^{2} (83.9/sq mi)
- Time zone: UTC+01:00 (CET)
  - Summer (DST): UTC+02:00 (CEST)
- INSEE/Postal code: 67133 /67320
- ^{1} French Land Register data, which excludes lakes, ponds, glaciers > 1 km^{2} (0.386 sq mi or 247 acres) and river estuaries.

Eschbourg (French pronunciation: [ɛʃbuʁ]; German: Eschburg) is a commune in the Bas-Rhin department and Grand Est region of north-eastern France.

== See also ==
- Communes of the Bas-Rhin department
