= Bischheim Musée du bain rituel juif =

Museum in Bischheim, France

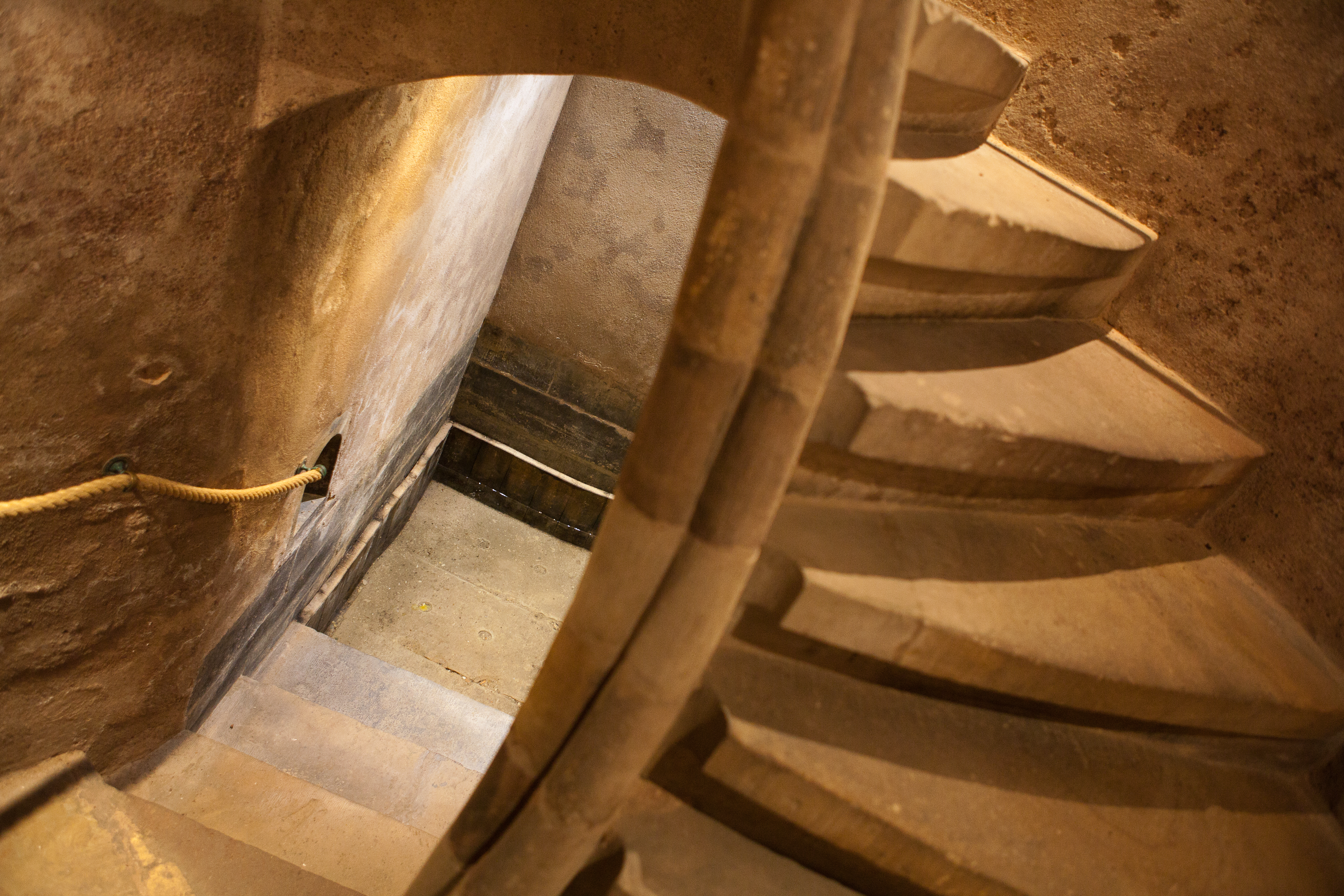
- Staircase leading to the bath

- Location within France
- Location: Bischheim, France
- Coordinates: 48.6147°N 7.7553°E

The Bischheim Musée du bain rituel juif (Jewish ritual bath museum of Bischheim) is a museum in Bischheim, France, in which Jewish bathing rituals were practiced, now recognized as a historical monument in France.

== History ==
The large, half-timbered house was built by Stettmeister Jacques Frédéric Boecklin de Boecklinsau, the second son of Jean-Philippe Boecklin. The Jewish banker Baruch Lévy acquired it during the French Revolution. He arranged for the mikveh to be built in the basement. In the Jewish tradition the word mikveh, a gathering of the waters, designates an underground basin supplied with pure water by a natural spring. The Bischheim bath is an unusual example. The bath is more important than a synagogue because of the strict laws in the Jewish tradition that related to hygiene. It was also used for the monthly purification of women.

On 17 May 1977 the mikveh was classified a historic monument. It has been carefully restored. The house is also used for the municipal library.

== Description ==
A spiral staircase leads down to the vault, built in Renaissance style, that dates to the last quarter of the sixteenth century. The staircase has been completely renovated. It is about 7.5 metres (25 ft) in height, with a cloakroom halfway down about 7 square metres (75 sq ft) in area. There are niches in the wall to hold candles or oil lamps. The bath itself is dug into alluvial ground over 8.5 metres (28 ft) below ground level, fed by groundwater. Heavy rains and periods of high water provide clear water to the bath. There are two holes in the vaulted ceiling that allow for addition of hot water to slightly warm the 500 litres (110 imp gal; 130 US gal) of water. The bath room is about 4 metres (13 ft) from the base of the tank to the ceiling.

== Museum ==
The David Sintzheim (Note: David Sintzheim was a rabbi in Bischheim who was called by Napoleon to serve on the Grand Sanhedrin in 1806, and who became the first chief rabbi of France in 1807.) room of the museum on the ground floor presents a collection of Jewish religious objects and documents related to the history of Judaism in Bischeim. Objects include the scrolls of the Torah, a wine jug for the Kiddush ceremony and a Menorah candlestick. Some space is used to display documents and objects related to the life of Émile Waldteufel (1837-1915), a native of Bischheim who is considered the father of the French waltz, and who was named director of dance music for Napoleon III in 1865.

== Sources ==
- "Cour des Boecklin, Bischheim". Topic-Topos. Archived from the original on 2016-03-04.
- Le miqvé (PDF). Ville de Bischheim. Archived from the original (PDF) on 2017-04-12.
- Meyers, Della; Tchelistcheff, Kiera (2005). Images of Alsace. The Bookworm. p. 101. ISBN 978-2-9524377-0-7.
- "Musée du bain rituel juif". Tourisme Alsace.
