= Ville-sur-Illon =

- Commune
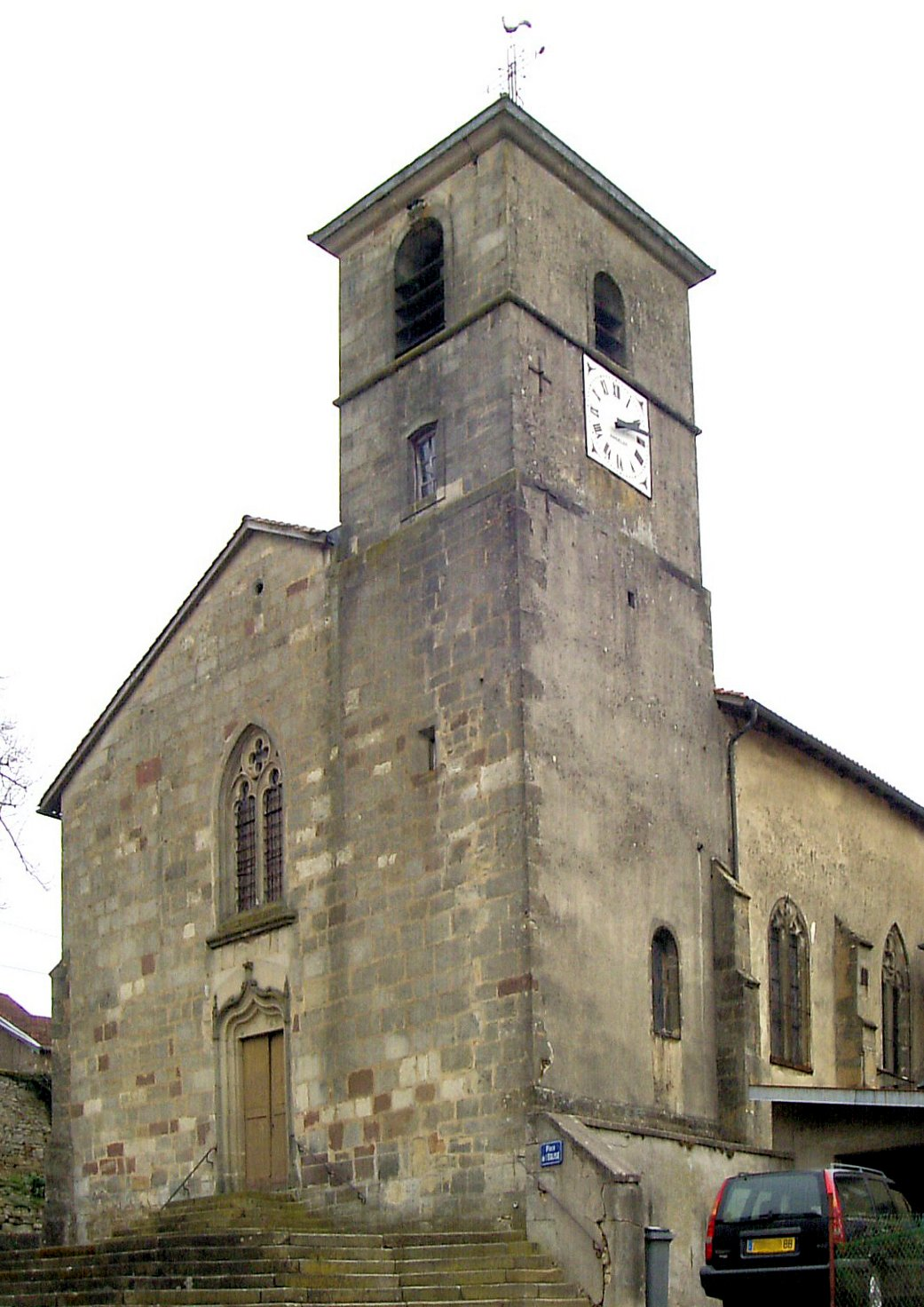
- Saint-Sulpice church

- Coat of arms
- Location of Ville-sur-Illon
- Location within France Location within Grand Est
- Coordinates: 48°10′49″N 6°12′39″E
- Country: France
- Region: Grand Est
- Department: Vosges
- Arrondissement: Neufchâteau
- Canton: Darney
- Intercommunality: CC Mirecourt Dompaire

Government
  - Mayor (2020–2026): Colette Comesse Dautrey
- Area^{1}: 17.89 km^{2} (6.91 sq mi)
- Elevation: 325 m (1,066 ft)
- Highest elevation: 396 m (1,299 ft)
- Lowest elevation: 299 m (981 ft)
- Population (2023): 517
  - Density: 28.9/km^{2} (74.8/sq mi)
- Time zone: UTC+01:00 (CET)
  - Summer (DST): UTC+02:00 (CEST)
- INSEE/Postal code: 88508 /88270
- ^{1} French Land Register data, which excludes lakes, ponds, glaciers > 1 km^{2} (0.386 sq mi or 247 acres) and river estuaries.

Ville-sur-Illon is a commune in the Vosges department in Grand Est in northeastern France.

== See also ==
- Communes of the Vosges department
