= Museum of France =

Title given to the main state museums in France

Logo of the label musée de France

Museum of France (French: Musée de France, pronounced [myze də fʁɑ̃s]) is a title given to the main state museums in France. It was set up by a law of 4 January 2002, known as loi musée (museum law), now codified in the code du patrimoine. As of 1 January 2019, the list of Museums of France on Muséofile included 1,315 museums and 1,223 as of January 1, 2020.
