= Fortified Sector of Haguenau =

Historic French border fortifications

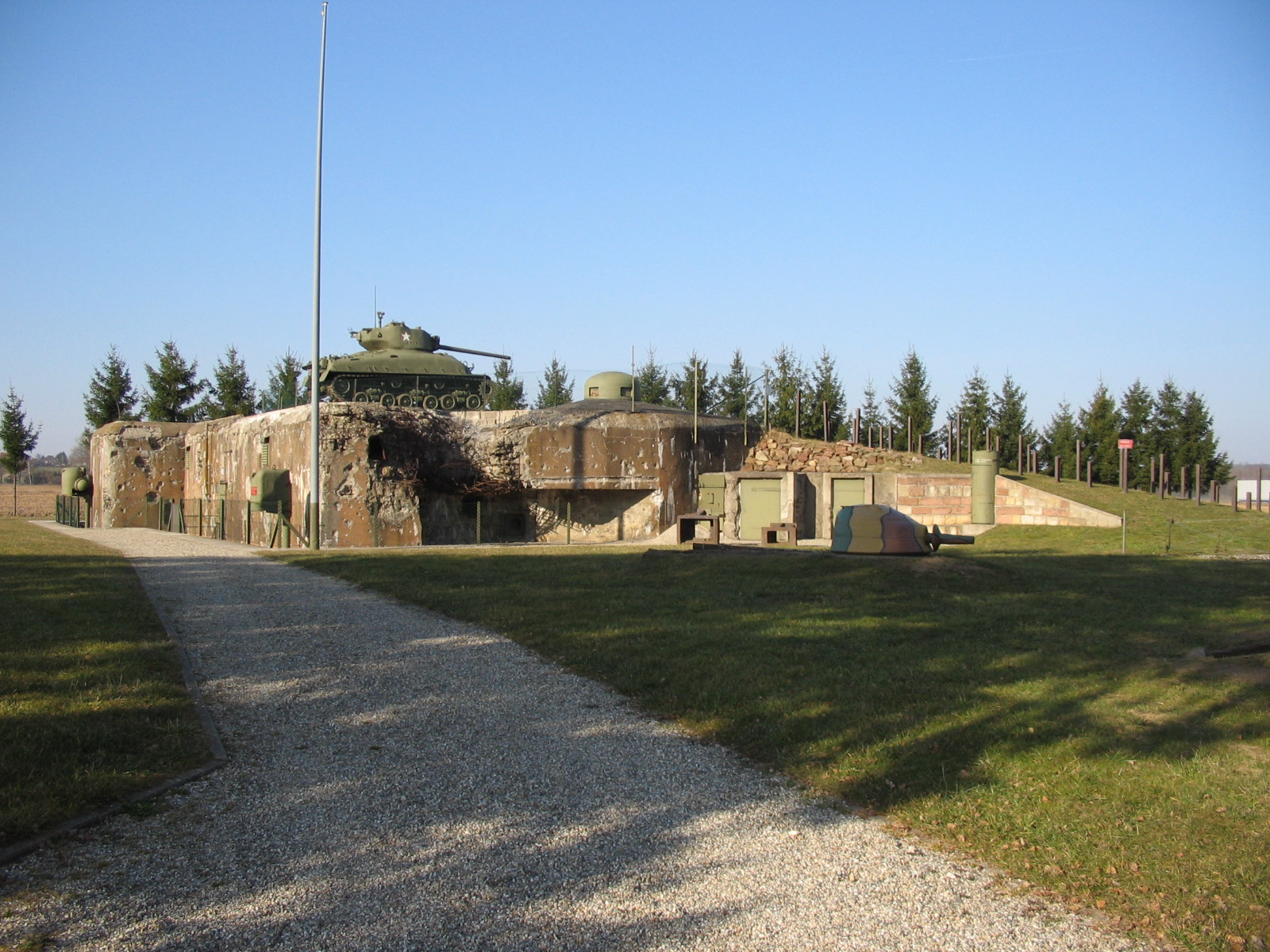
Casemate d'Esch, now a museum

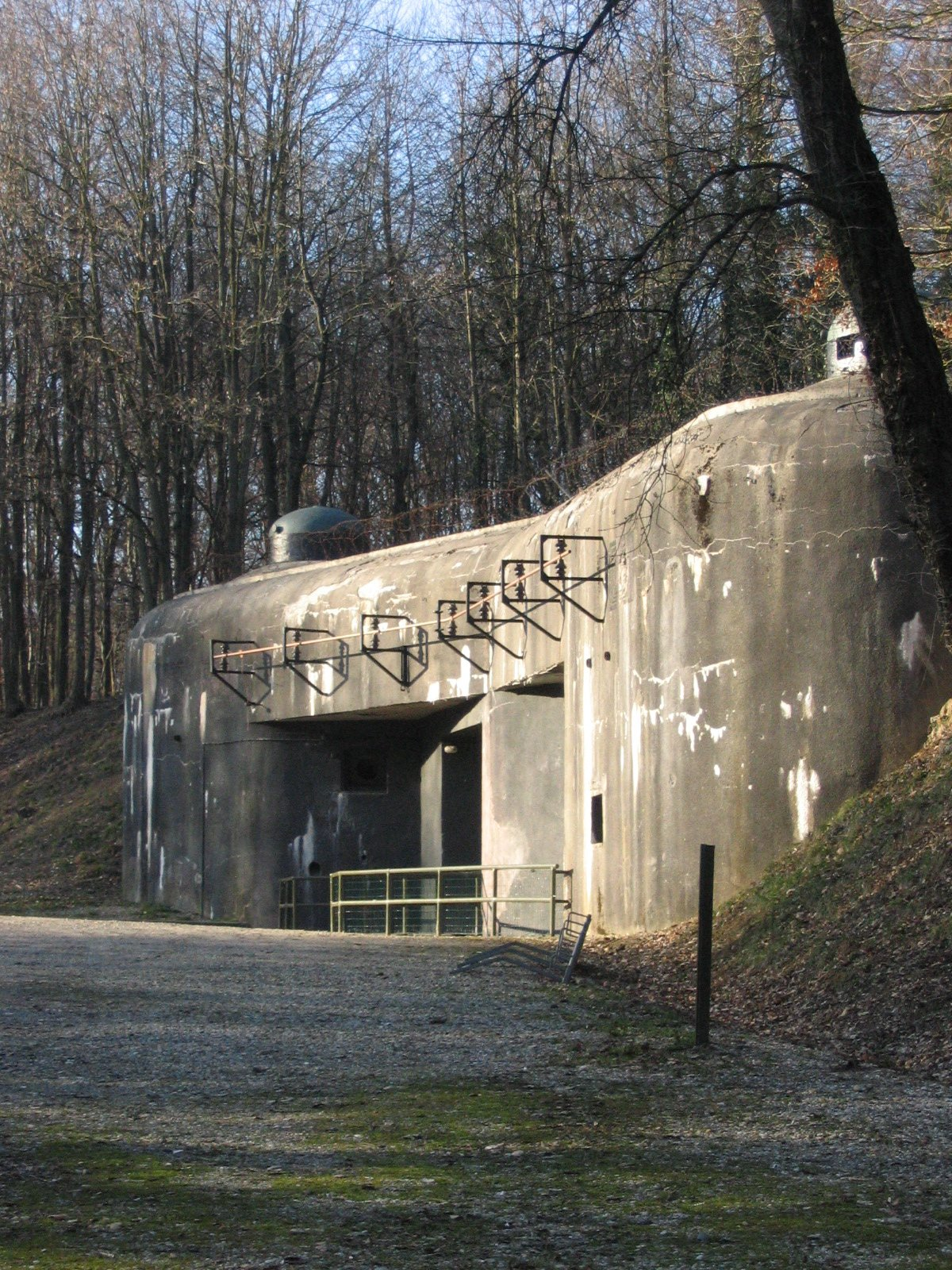
Munitions entrance, Ouvrage Schoenenbourg

The Fortified Sector of Haguenau (Secteur Fortifiée de Haguenau) was the French military organization that in 1940 controlled the most easterly section of the Maginot Line, to the north of Strasbourg. The left (western) wing of the Haguenau sector adjoined the Fortified Sector of the Vosges, includes two of the largest Maginot fortifications, Ouvrage Hochwald and Ouvrage Schoenenbourg. The right wing, started after 1931, was progressively scaled back in order to save money during the Great Depression, abandoning plans for four petit ouvrages and substituting casemates. The sector's northern and eastern sides bordered on Germany. To the south the sector borders the Fortified Sector of the Lower Rhine, from which it received several casemates in a boundary shift in 1940.

The SF Haguenau was attacked in 1940 by German forces in the Battle of France. The sector successfully fended off German assaults before the Second Armistice at Compiègne. The positions and their garrisons finally surrendered on 1 July 1940. The sector saw action again in 1944 and 1945 as American forces advanced into Alsace. The sector's easternmost sections saw heavy fighting in January 1945 during the German Operation Nordwind offensive. Following the war some positions were reactivated for use during the Cold War, with continued use of Ouvrage Hochwald as an air defense command center to the present day. Ouvrage Schoenenbourg has been preserved as a museum and is open to the public, as well as the Casemate d'Esch.

== Concept and organization ==
The Haguenau sector was part of the larger Fortified Region of the Lauter, a strongly defended area between the Sarre to the west and the Rhine Valley to the east. The Lauter region was more important during the planning and construction phase of the Maginot Line than it was in the operational phase of the Line, when the sectors assumed prominence. The Fortified Region of the Lauter was dissolved as a military organization on 5 March 1940, becoming the 43rd Fortress Army Corps.

The Haguenau sector uniquely combined two aspects of the Maginot fortifications: two gros ouvrages of the largest kind in the west, and lighter casemate lines farther east, with multilayered lines of casemates along the Rhine. The sector thus forms a transition from the heavily fortified section of the central Line to the lighter positions along the Rhine sectors. In preliminary planning in 1925 the Commission de Défense des Frontiers regarded the Rhine and its branches as a significant obstacle, backed by the heights of the Vosges. The Hochwald and Schoenenbourg positions were planned to anchor the right flank of the Maginot defenses on the easternmost heights of the Vosges. To the south, Strasbourg was to be considered an open city, as it could otherwise be easily destroyed by German artillery on the other side of the Rhine.

The Herrlisheim sub-sector of the neighboring Fortified Sector of the Lower Rhine was transferred to the SF Haguenau on 5 March 1940 when the SF Lower Rhine was reorganized as the 103rd Fortress Infantry Division. The riverbank fortifications were of a basic nature, with protection only up to 155mm caliber, machine gun armament and no electrical system. The second and third lines were more robust in construction and equipment, with electric generators and anti-tank weapons.

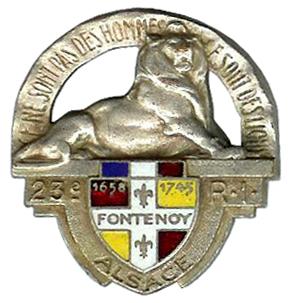
Insignia of the 23rd RIF.

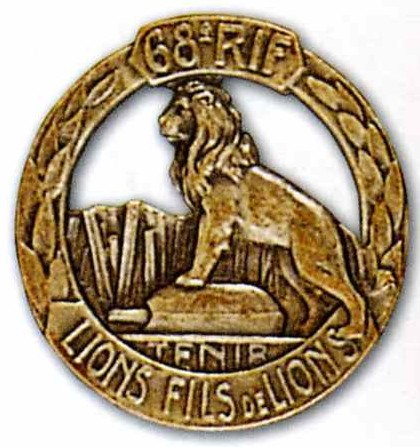
Insignia of the 68th RIF.

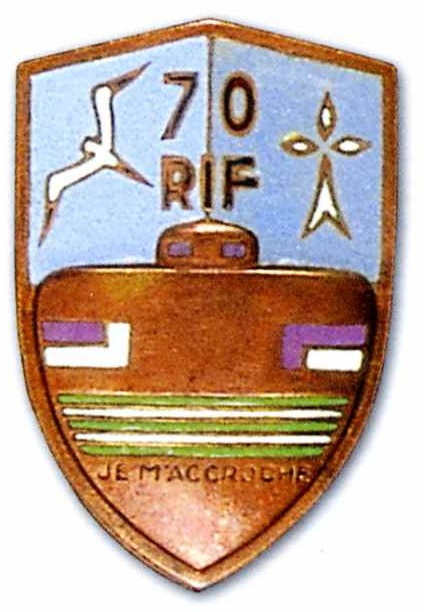
Insignia of the 70th RIF.

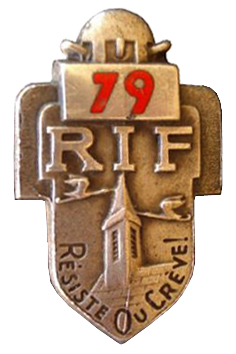
Insignia of the 79th RIF.

== Command ==
The Haguenau sector was under the overall command of the French 5th Army, headquartered at Wangenbourg, under the command of General Bourret, which was in turn part of Army Group 2 under General André-Gaston Prételat. The SF Haguenau was commanded by Commandant Laherre, then Lieutenant Colonel Schwartz. The command post was located at Reimerswiller, although Schwartz's command post was at Hochwald. The interval troops, the army formations that were to provide the mobile defense for the sector, to support and be supported by the fixed defenses, were under the command of the 12th Corps (12e Corps d'Armee), General Dentz, commander. The 6th Corps was in turn made up of the 16th and 70th Infantry Divisions. Artillery support for the sector was provided by the 156th Position Artillery Regiment (Régiment d'Artillerie de Position (RAP)), which controlled both fixed and mobile artillery, commanded by Lieutenant Colonel Duval. The 16th ID was a Class A reserve formation, while the 70th ID was a Class B reserve division, unsuitable for heavy or sustained combat.

At the midpoint of the Battle of France on 1 June 1940, the fortress troops of the SF Haguenau amounted to five fortress infantry regiments in 12 battalions, comprising 670 officers and 22,000 men.

== Description ==
The sector includes, in order from west to east, the following major fortified positions, together with the most significant casemates and infantry shelters in each sub-sector: (Note: English-language sources use the French term ouvrage as the preferred term for the Maginot positions, in preference to "fort", a term usually reserved for older fortifications with passive defenses in the form of walls and ditches. The literal translation of ouvrage in the sense of a fortification in English is "work." A gros ouvrage is a large fortification with a significant artillery component, while a petit ouvrage is smaller, with lighter arms.)

=== Sub-sector of Péchelbronn ===
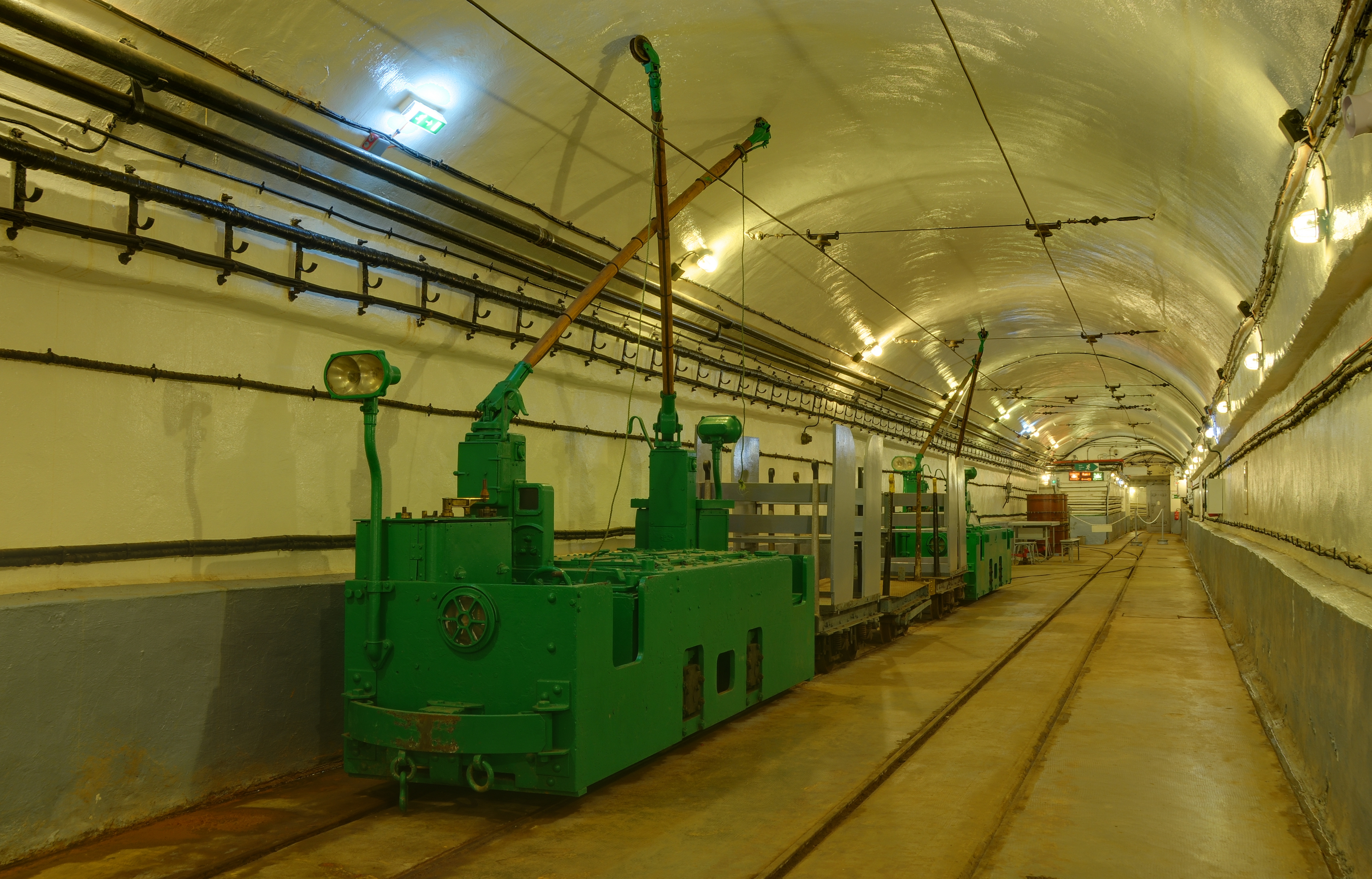
Interior of Schoenenbourg with electric train

22nd Fortress Infantry Regiment (164e Régiment d'Infanterie de Forteresse (RIF)), Lt. Colonel Lemai, followed by Chef de Bataillon Fabre in May 1940, command post in the Bois de Kirschpiel.

- Ouvrage Hochwald, gros ouvrage E 700/O720 of eleven combat blocks with nine detached casemates. Hochwald is effectively a complex of two connected gros ouvrages, and with Ouvrage Hackenberg is one of the two largest Maginot ouvrages.
- Ouvrage Schoenenbourg, gros ouvrage O 800 of six combat blocks
- Ouvrage de Bremmelbach, proposed petit ouvrage, completed as the linked casemates Bremmelbach Nord and Sud
- Casemate de Schmeltzenbach Est
- Abri de Walkmühl
- Abri de Birkenbach
- Casemate de Drachenbronn Nord (linked underground to Drachenbronn Sud)
- Casemate de Drachenbronn Sud (linked underground to Drachenbronn Nord)
- Casemate de Bremmelbach Nord (linked underground to Bremmelbach Sud)
- Casemate de Bremmelbach Sud (linked underground to Bremmelbach Nord)
- Casemate de Breitenacker Nord (linked underground to Breitenacker Nord)
- Casemate de Breitenacker Sud (linked underground to Breitenacker Sud)
- Abri de Grassersloch
- Abri de Schoenenbourg
- Casemate d'Ingolsheim Ouest
- Casemate de Ingolsheim Est

Peacetime barracks and support:

- Casernement de Drachenbronn (now Drachenbronn Air Base, incorporating portions of Hochwald)

=== Sub-sector of Hoffen ===
79th Fortress Infantry Regiment (79e Régiment d'Infanterie de Forteresse (RIF)), Lt. Colonel Rethoré, command post at position 1416, then the Abri du Bucholzberg from 17 June 1940.

- Ouvrage Moulin d'Hunspach, proposed petit ouvrage, completed as the casemates Moulin d'Hunspach Nord and Sud
- Ouvrage Bois d'Hoffen, proposed petit ouvrage, completed as the casemates Hoffen Est and Bois d'Hoffen
- Ouvrage Oberroeden, proposed petit ouvrage, completed as casemates Oberroeden Nord and Est
- Casemate d'Hunspach-Village
- Casemate d'Hunspach
- Casemate d'Hunspach-Station
- Casemate du Moulin d'Hunspach Ouest
- Casemate du Moulin d'Hunspach Ouest
- Abri du Buchholzberg
- Abri de Hoffen
- Abri de Hoffen Ouest
- Casemate de Hoffen Est
- Casemate du Bois de Hoffen
- Casemate d'Aschbach Ouest
- Casemate d'Aschbach Est
- Casemate d'Oberroedern Nord
- Casemate d'Obberroedern Est (Sud)
- Casemate de la Seltz
- Observatoire d'Hatten

Peacetime barracks and support:

- Casernement de Bockange

=== Sub-sector of Soufflenheim ===
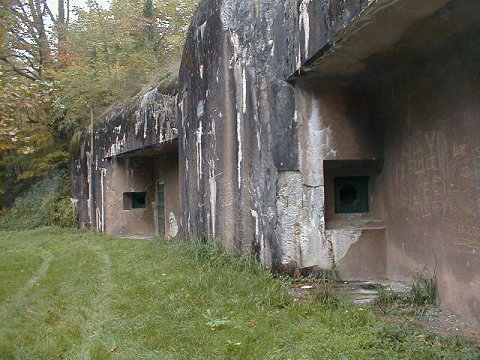
Casemate d'Heidenbuckel

23rd Fortress Infantry Regiment (23e Régiment d'Infanterie de Forteresse (RIF)), Lt. Colonel Lefèvre, command post at Soufflenheim.

- Ouvrage Kauffenheim, proposed gros ouvrage, completed as casemate Kauffenheim
- Casemate d'Hatten Nord
- Casemate d'Hatten Sud
- Casemate d'Esch
- Casemate d'Hatten (Abri de Hatten)
- Casemate du Bois-de-Rittershoffen 1
- Casemate du Bois-de-Rittershoffen 2
- Casemate du Bois-de-Rittershoffen 3
- Casemate du Bois-de-Rittershoffen 4
- Casemate du Bois-de-Rittershoffen 5
- Casemate du Bois-de-Rittershoffen 6
- Casemate de Koenigsbrück Nord
- Casemate de Koenigsbrück Sud
- Abri de Sauer
- Abri de Koenigsbrück
- Abri de Donau
- Casemate de Kauffenheim
- Abri du Heidenbuckel
- Casemate du Heidenbuckel
- Casemate de Rountzenheim Nord (linked underground to Rountzenheim Sud)
- Abri de Soufflenheim

Peacetime barracks and support:

- Casernement de Soufflenheim

=== Sub-sector of Sessenheim ===
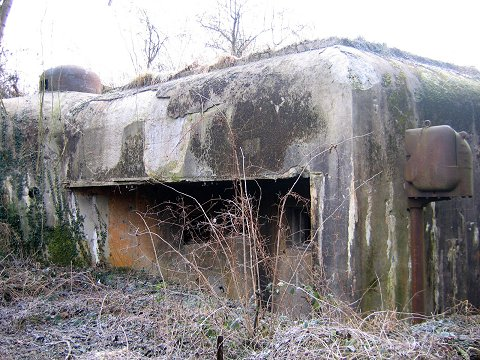
Casemate d'Auenheim Sud

68th Fortress Infantry Regiment (68e Régiment d'Infanterie de Forteresse (RIF)), Lt. Colonel Blanloeil.

- Ouvrage Auenheim, proposed gros ouvrage, completed as casemates Auenheim Nord and Sud
- Casemate de Rountzenheim Sud (linked underground to Rountzenheim Nord)
- Casemate d'Auenheim Nord
- Casemate d'Auenheim Sud 9/3

==== First line (riverbank) ====
- Casemate du Pont-de-Seltz
- Abri de Beinheim Nord 2/2
- Abri de Beinheim Sud 2bis/2
- Casemate du Pont-de-Roppenheim Nord
- Casemate du Pont-de-Roppenheim Sud
- Casemate de Neuhaeusel
- Casemate du Fort-Louis-Village
- Casemate du Fort-Louis-Ouest
- Casemate du Fort-Louis-Est
- Casemate de Stattmatten 10/3

==== Second line ====
- Casemate de Lobsann (never built)
- Casemate de Mettemuhl
- Casemate du Grosswald
- Casemate de Soultz Nord
- Casemate de Soultz Sud
- Casemate de Hohwiller (never built)
- Casemate de Kuhlendorf Nord
- Casemate de Kuhlendorf Sud
- Casemate de Niederbetschdorf Nord
- Casemate de Niederbetschdorf Nord-Est
- Casemate du Moulin-de-Rittershoffen

In addition to the casemate lines, a line of fifteen fortified frontier posts (avant-postes) and a line of approximately seventeen fortified houses completed the sector.

Peacetime barracks and support:

- Casernement d'Oberhoffen
- Casernement de Beinheim

=== Sub-sector of Herrlisheim ===
70th Fortress Infantry Regiment (70e Régiment d'Infanterie de Forteresse (RIF)), Lt. Colonel Schwartz, then Raynaud from April 1940. Transferred from the SF Lower Rhine 5 March 1940.

==== 9th CEC ====
CEC = Compangnie d'Équipage de Casemates, or "casemate company"

First line (riverbank)

- Casemate de Drusenheim Nord
- Casemate de Drusenheim Centre ("Abri de l'Ancienne Redoute")
- Casemate de Drusenheim Sud

Second line (shelters)

- Abri d'Ancien-Redoute 6/2

Third line (villages)

- Casemate de Neureid 12/3
- Casemate d'Ottendorf 14/3

Peacetime barracks and support:

- Casernement de Drusenheim

==== 10th CEC ====
First line (riverbank)

- Casemate de Gambsheim Nord
- Casemate de Gambsheim Centre
- Casemate de Gambsheim Sud

Second line (shelters)

- Abri de Kaelbergrund 7/2
- Abri d Haugrund 7bis/2

Third line (villages)

- Casemate de Mulrhein 15/3
- Casemate d Bettenhoffen 15bis/3
- Casemate de Kilstett 16/3

Peacetime barracks and support:

- Casernement de Gambsheim

== History ==
=== Battle of France ===
Hochwald was the first ouvrage to fire on the Germans on 8–9 September 1939 during the Phoney War, supporting French forces involved in the Saar Offensive. A number of problems with ammunition and weaponry were revealed by this action, and compatibility problems with guns and ordnance persisted into 1940 in other locations. Hochwald and Schoenenbourg fired their 75mm guns again on 16 October Hochwald fired again in November on Germans laying a minefield. At Schoenenbourg a 120mm gun exploded during target practice in March 1940.

The full German offensive opened on 10 May 1940. German attention was concentrated on Belgium and the Ardennes region, breaching a weak point in French frontier defenses at Sedan. The main Maginot Line was not directly attacked. However, as disaster overtook the French field armies, the interval troops were pulled out of the Line on 15 June in the central Line, but remained in the SF Haguenau. Having broken through at the Sarre, German troops moved behind the Line, heading east. Hochwald and Schoenenbourg came under aerial and artillery attack on 19 June, continuing the next day. Hochwald supported Lembach with its 75mm guns when the latter came under infantry attack, but the German 215th ID broke through a weakly fortified section of the Line west of Lembach in the SF Vosges. On 21 June a German 420mm mortar and a 355mm weapon began shelling Schoenenbourg, causing some damage but not breaching the position. Schoenenbourg received the heaviest bombardment of any Maginot fortification, comprising 160 aerial bombs, 50 42 cm shells, 33 28 cm shells, and approximately 3000 smaller projectiles,

In early June in the face of the German assault, all fortress units attached to the Fifth Army were ordered to prepare for withdrawal to the south and west. While fortress units under the 2nd, 3rd and 8th Armies received categorical instructions to prepare to sabotage their positions and conduct an orderly retreat from 14 to 17 June, Fifth Army commander General Bourret's instructions to the SFs Rohrbach, Vosges, Haguenau and Lower Rhine were not as definitive. The personnel of the SF Haguenau were to be consolidated into a Division de Marche entitled the DM Regard, consisting of the I/22, II/23, XXI/23, I/68, II/68, II/70, II/79 and III/79e RIFs, along with the 69e RAMF and the 156e RAP. A partial withdrawal of fortress troops took place in the SF Haguenau, with some battalions of each fortress infantry regiment remaining in their positions until the armistice to cover the withdrawal of the interval troops and the fortress infantry assigned to the divisions de marche.

None of the major positions in the SF Haguenau were captured by German forces prior to 25 June armistice. However, by 20 June the town of Haguenau to the rear of the Line had been captured by the German 215th Infantry Division, part of a German strategy to secure the Pechelbronn oilfield. To support the 215th ID, the German 246th Infantry Division was ordered to directly attack the SF Haguenau from the north. On the 20th the 246th attacked several casemates centering on Oberroeden Nord and Aschbach-Ouest and Est. Aerial bombing hit Oberroeden Nord and the Abri de Hoffen, disrupting communications but not seriously harming French defenses. German artillery hit an embrasure at Oberroeden Sud, killing one French soldier. Despite the intensity of the attack, the casemate line, aided by Hochwald and Schoenenbourg, held. The 246th withdrew with sixty-two killed, ten missing and about three hundred wounded.

The Second Compiègne armistice took effect on 25 June, stopping the fighting. The final surrender of Hochwald, Schoenenbourg and their lesser positions was effected on 1 July 1940, in accordance with the terms of the armistice. Hochwald had fired 19,550 of the 75mm, 135mm or 81mm rounds of the 90,315 on hand; Schoenenbourg 16,474 of 34,260. Under German occupation in 1940, Schoenenbourg was subjected to a new bombardment, filmed for propaganda purposes. In 1944 Hochwald (Werk Hochwald) was used as an underground factory.

==== Units ====
The 22nd RIF was deployed in the Pechelbronn area. The unit's first battalion was ordered to withdraw from the fortified line on 14 June as part of the DI Regard, falling back to Lure, then Héricourt to control the Besançon-Belfort road. The battalion was captured at Héricourt on 19 June. The other units of the 22nd RIF remained in their fortifications and surrendered on 1 July.

The 23rd RIF was stationed in the Soufflenheim sub-sector. The sub-sector experienced bombardments beginning 14 May, with direct assault finally beginning 13 June, at the same time as orders arrived to detach the second and 21st battalions to the DF Regarde. The second battalion was sent to Vesoul, then to Lure, while the 21st was ordered to Sainte-Croix-aux-Mines and the Col de Sainte-Marie. The battalions saw action at several locations in the Haute-Saône before finally being captured on the 25th in the Vosges. The first battalion and CEC (compagnie d'équipage de casemates) 5 and 6 remained in their fortifications to surrender on 2 July.

The 68th RIF occupied the sub-sector of Sessenheim. From 14 June the first and second companies were attached to the DF Regard and were assigned to guard the rail line between Épinal and Vaivre, the first company assigned to an area near Vesoul, and the second at Sainte-Marie-aux-Mines. Both were captured between 19 and 22 June. The third battalion, left behind in the casemates, repelled attacks on 16 and 17 June and surrendering on 30 June.

The 70th RIF occupied the Herrlisheim sub-sector. Transferred from the Lower Rhine to the Haguenau sector on 5 March 1940, the regiment lost its first and second battalions to the 70/79 régiment de marche on 13 June. The formation was integrated into the 103rd DIF (the former SF Lower Rhine) and moved to Plaine and Diespach. After the armistice the units moved to Salm and were captured on 25 June. The casemate garrisons became part of the so-called groupement Schwartz after the sector's commander, and were repositioned to face to the south in the direction of the German 215th ID's threat. The garrison units surrendered on 2 July.

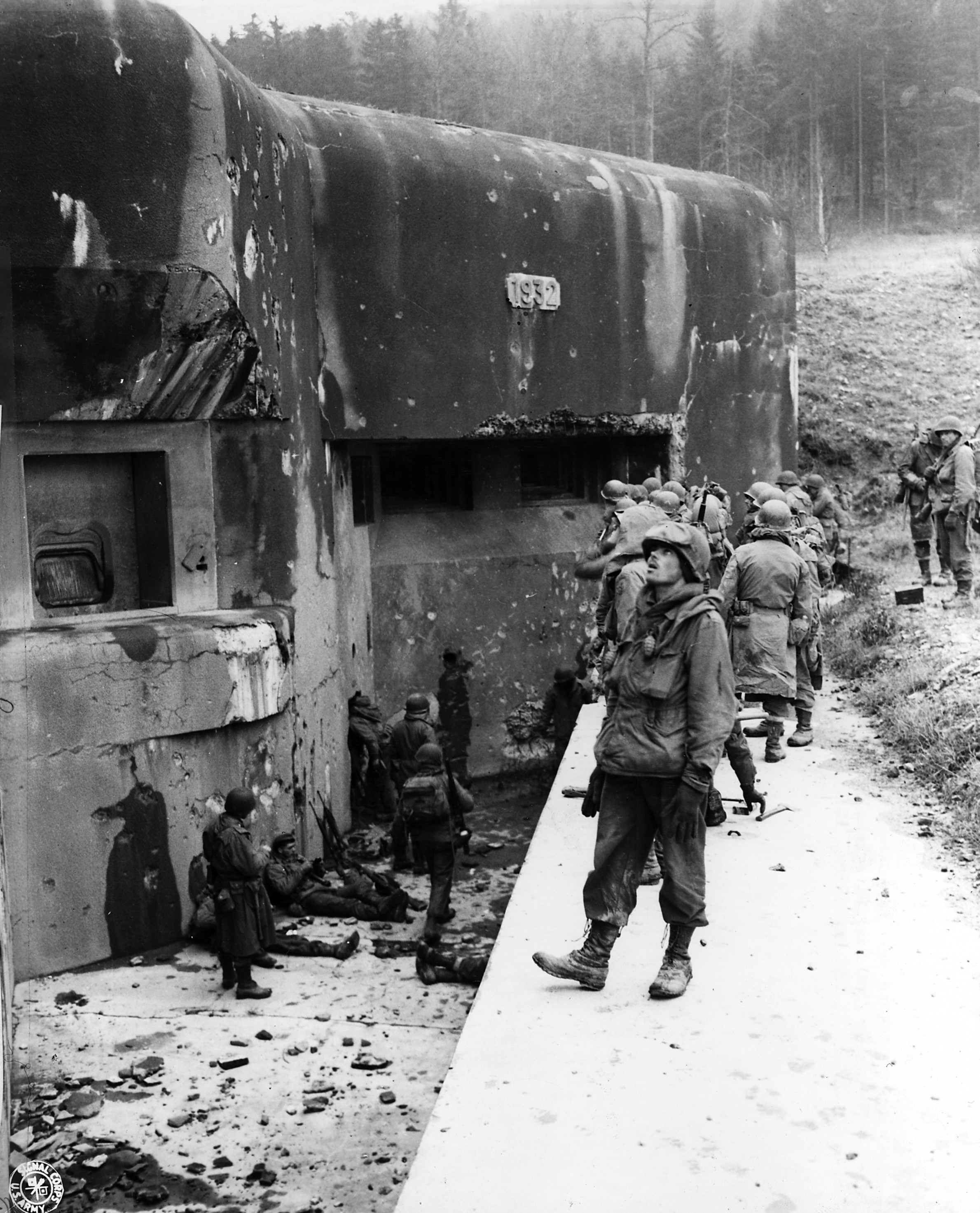
US soldiers at Hochwald in 1944

=== Operation Nordwind ===
While the Haguenau positions played little role in Allied advances in 1944, the retreating Germans caused significant damage to Hochwald, blowing up turrets, entrance blocks and several combat blocks before abandoning the position. Somewhat later, in 1945, Schoenenbourg and nearby casemates Schmeltzbach Ouest, Drachenbronn Nordand Sud and Bremmelbach received the same treatment from the German 245th ID before the American 36th Infantry Division took possession. In the Alsace Plain Ingolsheim Nord and Ouest, Hunspach Village, Seltz and others were blown up.

The eastern portion of the sector was the scene of heavy fighting in January 1945 as a result of the German Operation Nordwind offensive aimed at the recapture of Strasbourg. German forces of Army Group G attacked the U.S. 7th Army and French First Army. American units retreated south to the casemate line and dug in, holding on from 8 January to 21 January, before falling back to Haguenau.

=== Môle de Haguenau ===
Following World War II, the French military reclaimed the Maginot Line with the aim of renovating and improving it against a possible attack by Warsaw Pact forces. The strongest positions, Hochwald and Schoenenbourg were grouped with Four-à-Chaux and Lembach from the SF Vosges. They were designated the môle de Haguenau ("breakwater") in 1951 and were placed back into service after a period of rehabilitation. After the establishment of the French nuclear strike force, the importance of the Line declined, and maintenance ceased in the 1970s, with most of the casemates sold.

in 1956, Hochwald was transferred to the French Air Force for use as an air defense command center. New underground galleries were built in the rear (i.e., near the entrance blocks). The nearby Caserne de Drachenbronn became the above-ground support and operations facility. The complex was briefly known as Ouvrage H before its designation as Base Aérienne 901 Drachenbronn.

== Present status ==
On 4 September 2001, Schoenenbourg was the first gros ouvrage to be sold by the Ministry of Defense to a local community. Schoenenbourg is maintained as a museum and may be visited. The Casemate d'Esch is maintained as a museum by the same organization. The site is notable for the American M4 Sherman tank perched on top of the casemate.

Hochwald remains in French military hands, housing the hardened command center for French Air Force activities at Drachenbronn Air Base/BA 901. Its former caserne provides support and above-ground operational functions. The Bockange caserne is a paintball range.

The Casemate d'Oberroedern Sud is maintained as "Casemate Rieiffel" by the Association des Amis de la Ligne Maginot d'Oberroeden, which has restored the casemate since 2001. The organization is also working on the casemates at Aschbach Est, Aschbach Ouest and Bois d'Hoffen, however these are not presently open to the public. The Abri du Heidenbuckel has been preserved by the Association des Amis du Heidenbuckel, and is open at times during the summer. The Casemate de Kilstett is under restoration

The Casemate de Hatten is preserved by the Association des amis du museé de l'Abri de Hatten as the Abri de Hatten, and may be visited.

The Drusenheim Centre casemate is maintained as the "Abri de l'Ancienne Redoute" and may be visited. The same organization is restoring the Casemate de Kilstett.

== Bibliography ==
- Allcorn, William. The Maginot Line 1928-45. Oxford: Osprey Publishing, 2003. ISBN 1-84176-646-1
- Degon, André; Zylberyng, Didier, La Ligne Maginot: Guide des Forts à Visiter, Editions Ouest-France, 2014. ISBN 978-2-7373-6080-0 (in French)
- Kaufmann, J.E. and Kaufmann, H.W. Fortress France: The Maginot Line and French Defenses in World War II, Stackpole Books, 2006. ISBN 0-275-98345-5
- Kaufmann, J.E., Kaufmann, H.W., Jancovič-Potočnik, A. and Lang, P. The Maginot Line: History and Guide, Pen and Sword, 2011. ISBN 978-1-84884-068-3
- Mary, Jean-Yves; Hohnadel, Alain; Sicard, Jacques. Hommes et Ouvrages de la Ligne Maginot, Tome 1. Paris, Histoire & Collections, 2001. ISBN 2-908182-88-2 (in French)
- Mary, Jean-Yves; Hohnadel, Alain; Sicard, Jacques. Hommes et Ouvrages de la Ligne Maginot, Tome 3. Paris, Histoire & Collections, 2003. ISBN 2-913903-88-6 (in French)
- Mary, Jean-Yves; Hohnadel, Alain; Sicard, Jacques. Hommes et Ouvrages de la Ligne Maginot, Tome 5. Paris, Histoire & Collections, 2009. ISBN 978-2-35250-127-5 (in French)
- Romanych, Marc; Rupp, Martin. Maginot Line 1940: Battles on the French Frontier. Oxford: Osprey Publishing, 2010. ISBN 1-84176-646-1
