= Rieffel =

Rieffel is a surname. Notable people with the surname include:

- Lt. Rieffel, French commander of Casemate d'Oberroedern Sud in World War II
- Eleanor Rieffel, American mathematician
- Lisa Rieffel (born 1975), American actress, singer and musician
- Marc Rieffel, American mathematician
