= Casemate d'Oberroedern Sud =

Casemate de Marckolsheim Sud
- Part of Maginot Line Rhine fortifications
- Northeast France

Site information
- Controlled by: France
- Open to the public: Yes
- Condition: Preserved

Location
- Coordinates: 48.92033°N 7.98171°E

Site history
- Built by: CORF
- Materials: Concrete, steel
- Battles/wars: Battle of France

The Casemate d'Oberroedern Sud, also known as Casemate Reiffel and Oberroedern Est, is a pre-World War II fortified position near the Rhine River in eastern France. The casemate was part of an extension of the Maginot Line fortifications along France's border with Germany. As a unit of the Fortified Sector of Haguenau, the casemate was part of French defences in June 1940. It has been preserved and is a component of a museum focusing on the Rhine section of the Maginot Line. The museum is located at the eastern edge of the town of Oberrœdern.

== Concept and design ==
Unlike other portions of the Maginot Line, the Rhine defences were not interconnected, consisting of individual casemates or blockhouses a few hundred metres apart, arranged to fire along the length of the defended frontier. In initial planning, a Maginot ouvrage with several combat blocks, interconnected and served by underground galleries, barracks and magazines, was planned for Oberroedern. The plan was reduced to two separate casemates, Oberroedern Nord and Sud. The casemate is arranged on two levels, with living facilities and utilities on the lower level and combat stations on the upper level. The casemate fired to the north and south along the casemate line, and a 37 mm anti-tank gun/JM machine gun combination firing to the south and an AC37/JM firing to the north, with a JM machine gun firing to the west. A GFM cloche on the top of the casemate allowed for protected observation. Firing ports for light automatic rifles covered the entrance and the area around the casemate.

== Manning ==
The casemate was commanded after September 1939 by Lieutenant Rieffel, with twenty troops from the 79th Fortress Infantry Regiment.

== 1940 ==
See Fortified Sector of Haguenau for a broader discussion of the Haguenau sector of the French defenses.

The area around Hoffen and Oberroedern saw the heaviest fighting along the Rhine defences during the Battle of France in June 1940. On June 12 the casemate was attacked by German Stuka dive bombers, while German patrols infiltrated the country nearby. On June 20 the German 246th Infantry Division attacked several casemates centring on Oberroeden Nord and Aschbach-Ouest and Est. Aerial bombing hit Oberroeden Nord and the Abri de Hoffen, disrupting communications but not seriously harming the French defences. German artillery hit an embrasure at Oberroeden Sud, killing Sergeant Delsart, who was buried that night just outside. Despite the intensity of the attack, the casemate line, aided by the Maginot ouvrages Hochwald and Schoenenbourg, held. On June 24 the casemate was abandoned on orders from the French command and its garrison was taken into captivity.

The nearby Oberroedern Nord casemate came under heavy aerial attack at the same time as Onberroedern Sud. A bomb that fell into the 'fosse' (ditch) outside the casemate's entrance exploded with sufficient force to lift the casemate, briefly panicking the garrison.

== Preservation ==
The Casemate d'Oberroedern Sud is maintained as "Casemate Rieiffel" by the Association des Amis de la Ligne Maginot d'Oberroeden, which has maintained the casemate since 2001. The organisation also oversees the casemates at Aschbach Est ("Casemate Beck"), Aschbach Ouest ("Casemate Linger") and Bois d'Hoffen. However these are not presently open to the public.

== Bibliography ==
- Allcorn, William. The Maginot Line 1928-45. Oxford: Osprey Publishing, 2003. ISBN 1-84176-646-1
- Kaufmann, J.E. and Kaufmann, H.W. Fortress France: The Maginot Line and French Defenses in World War II, Stackpole Books, 2006. ISBN 0-275-98345-5
- Kaufmann, J.E., Kaufmann, H.W., Jancovič-Potočnik, A. and Lang, P. The Maginot Line: History and Guide, Pen and Sword, 2011. ISBN 978-1-84884-068-3
- Mary, Jean-Yves; Hohnadel, Alain; Sicard, Jacques. Hommes et Ouvrages de la Ligne Maginot, Tome 1. Paris, Histoire & Collections, 2001. ISBN 2-908182-88-2 (in French)
- Mary, Jean-Yves; Hohnadel, Alain; Sicard, Jacques. Hommes et Ouvrages de la Ligne Maginot, Tome 2. Paris, Histoire & Collections, 2003. ISBN 2-908182-97-1 (in French)
- Mary, Jean-Yves; Hohnadel, Alain; Sicard, Jacques. Hommes et Ouvrages de la Ligne Maginot, Tome 3. Paris, Histoire & Collections, 2003. ISBN 2-913903-88-6 (in French)
- Mary, Jean-Yves; Hohnadel, Alain; Sicard, Jacques. Hommes et Ouvrages de la Ligne Maginot, Tome 5. Paris, Histoire & Collections, 2009. ISBN 978-2-35250-127-5 (in French)
