= Schœnenbourg =

- Commune
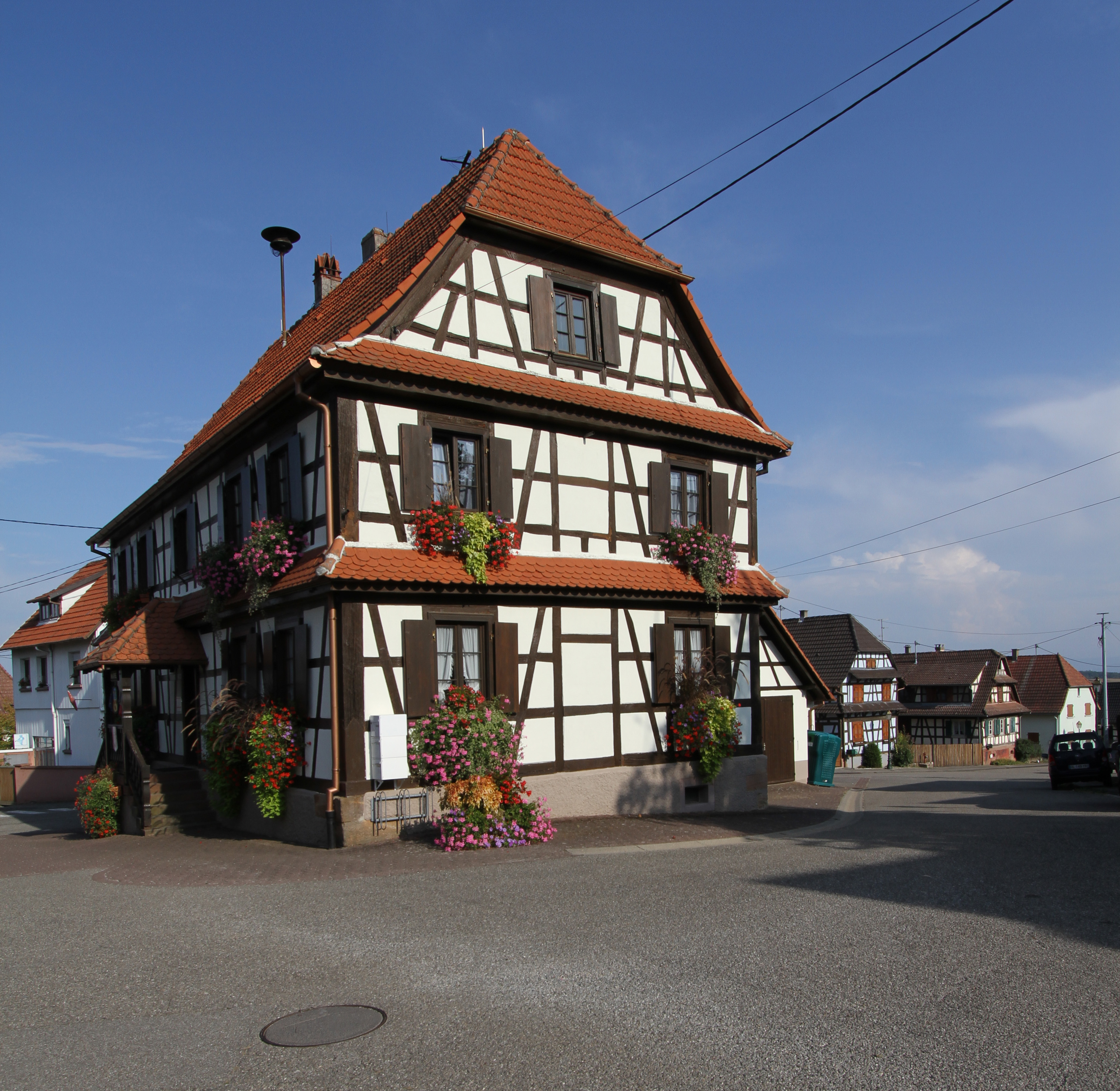
- The town hall in Schœnenbourg

- Coat of arms
- Location of Schœnenbourg
- Location within France Location within Grand Est
- Coordinates: 48°57′09″N 7°54′50″E
- Country: France
- Region: Grand Est
- Department: Bas-Rhin
- Arrondissement: Haguenau-Wissembourg
- Canton: Wissembourg

Government
  - Mayor (2020–2026): Marc Meyer
- Area^{1}: 5.47 km^{2} (2.11 sq mi)
- Highest elevation: 198 m (650 ft)
- Lowest elevation: 140 m (460 ft)
- Population (2023): 720
  - Density: 130/km^{2} (340/sq mi)
- Time zone: UTC+01:00 (CET)
  - Summer (DST): UTC+02:00 (CEST)
- INSEE/Postal code: 67455 /67250
- ^{1} French Land Register data, which excludes lakes, ponds, glaciers > 1 km^{2} (0.386 sq mi or 247 acres) and river estuaries.

Schœnenbourg (French pronunciation: [ʃønənbuʁ]; German: Schönenburg; Alsatian: Scheeneburi) is a commune in the Bas-Rhin department in Grand Est in north-eastern France. As of 2023, the population of the commune was 720. It contains Schœnenbourg fort, a defensive structure making up part of the Maginot Line.

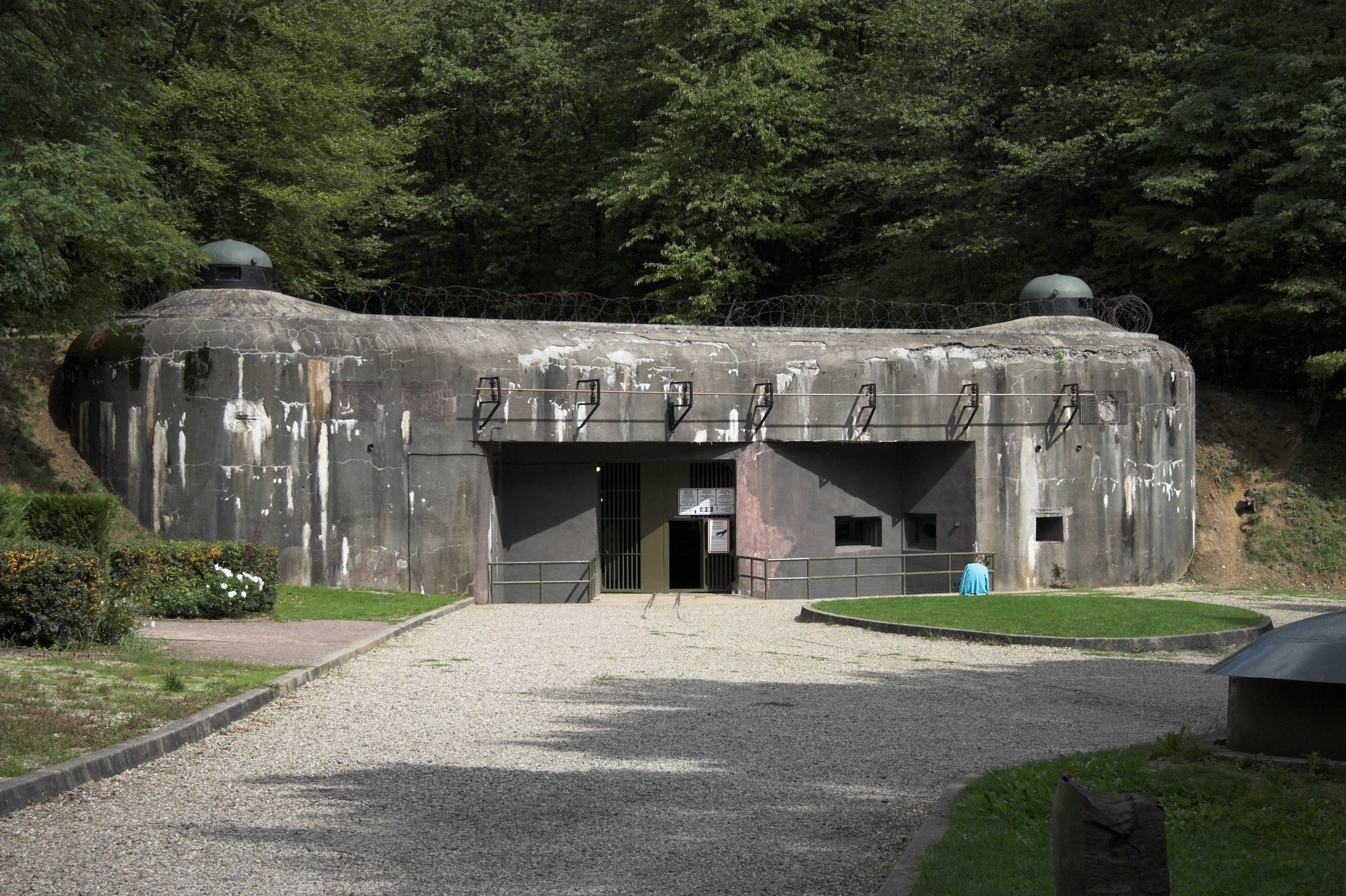
Schoenenbourg Fort

== See also ==
- Ouvrage Schoenenbourg, a Maginot Line fortification
- Communes of the Bas-Rhin department
