= Hunspach =

Hunspach Hunschpàch
- Commune
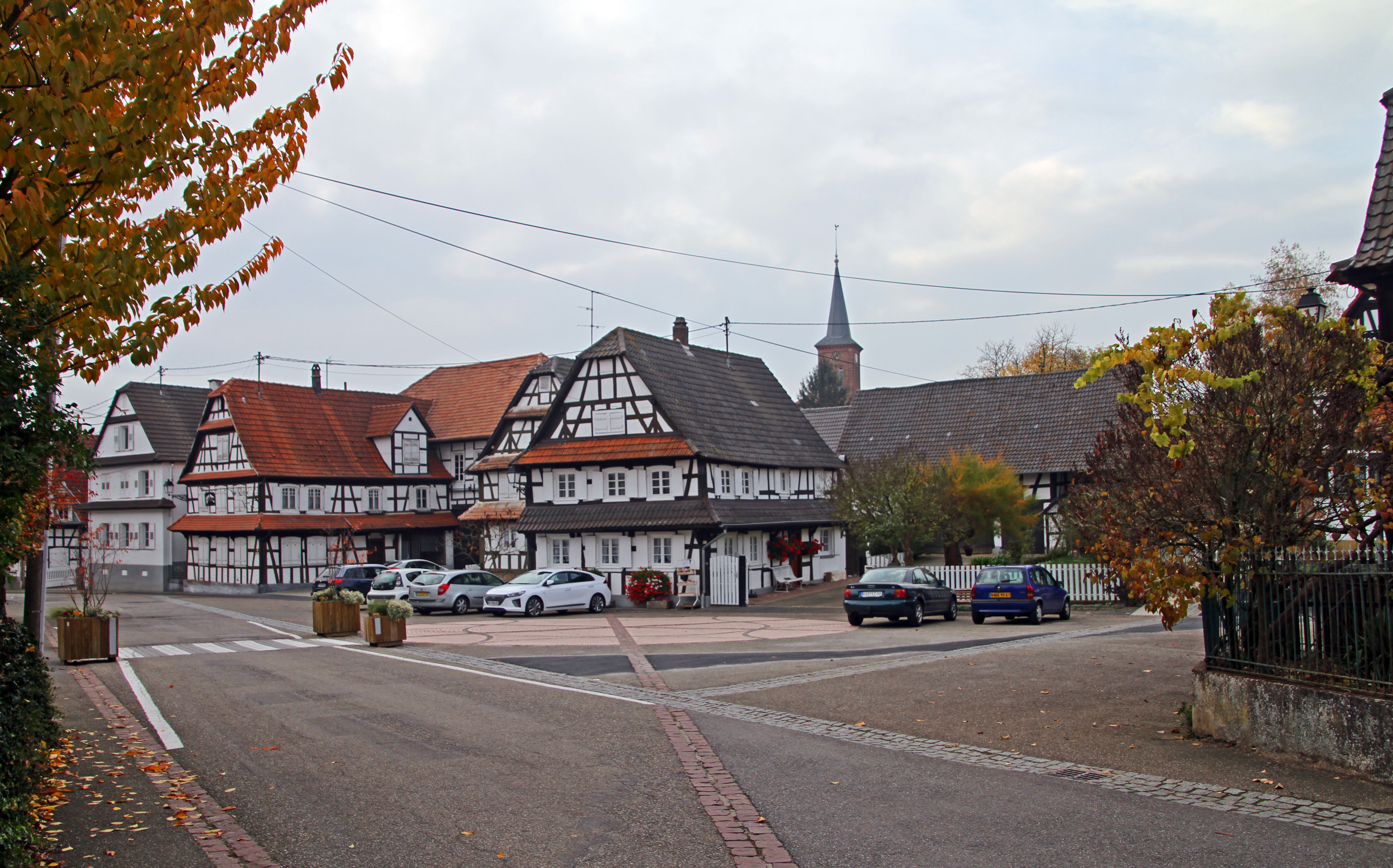
- Main Street in Hunspach

- Coat of arms
- Location of Hunspach
- Location within France Location within Grand Est
- Coordinates: 48°57′N 7°56′E
- Country: France
- Region: Grand Est
- Department: Bas-Rhin
- Arrondissement: Haguenau-Wissembourg
- Canton: Wissembourg

Government
  - Mayor (2020–2026): Bertrand Wahl
- Area^{1}: 5.49 km^{2} (2.12 sq mi)
- Highest elevation: 207 m (679 ft)
- Lowest elevation: 138 m (453 ft)
- Population (2023): 628
  - Density: 114/km^{2} (296/sq mi)
- Time zone: UTC+01:00 (CET)
  - Summer (DST): UTC+02:00 (CEST)
- INSEE/Postal code: 67213 /67250
- ^{1} French Land Register data, which excludes lakes, ponds, glaciers > 1 km^{2} (0.386 sq mi or 247 acres) and river estuaries.

Hunspach (French pronunciation: [unspax] or French pronunciation: [unʃpax]) is a commune in the Bas-Rhin department in Grand Est in north-eastern France. In 2020 it was voted the «Village préféré des Français» (France's favourite village).

== Geography ==
The commune lies a short distance to the south of Wissembourg within the Northern Vosges Regional Nature Park.

== Sights ==
The village is a member of the Les Plus Beaux Villages de France ("The most beautiful villages of France") association.

Hunspach has retained much of its traditional architecture. The houses are white and in the Alsatian half timbered style. Open central yards offer glimpses of the working farms within.

== Photo gallery ==
Hunspach

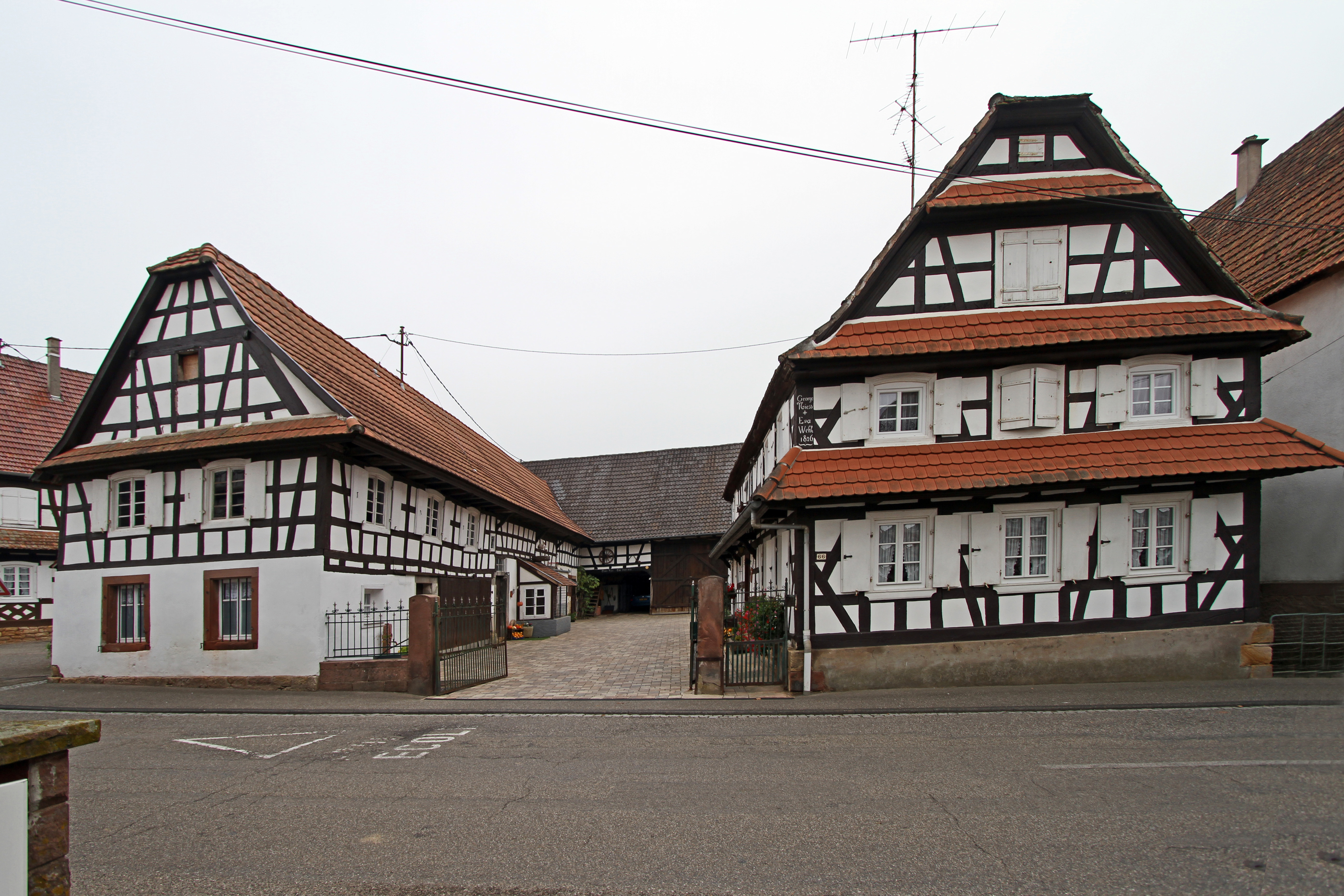

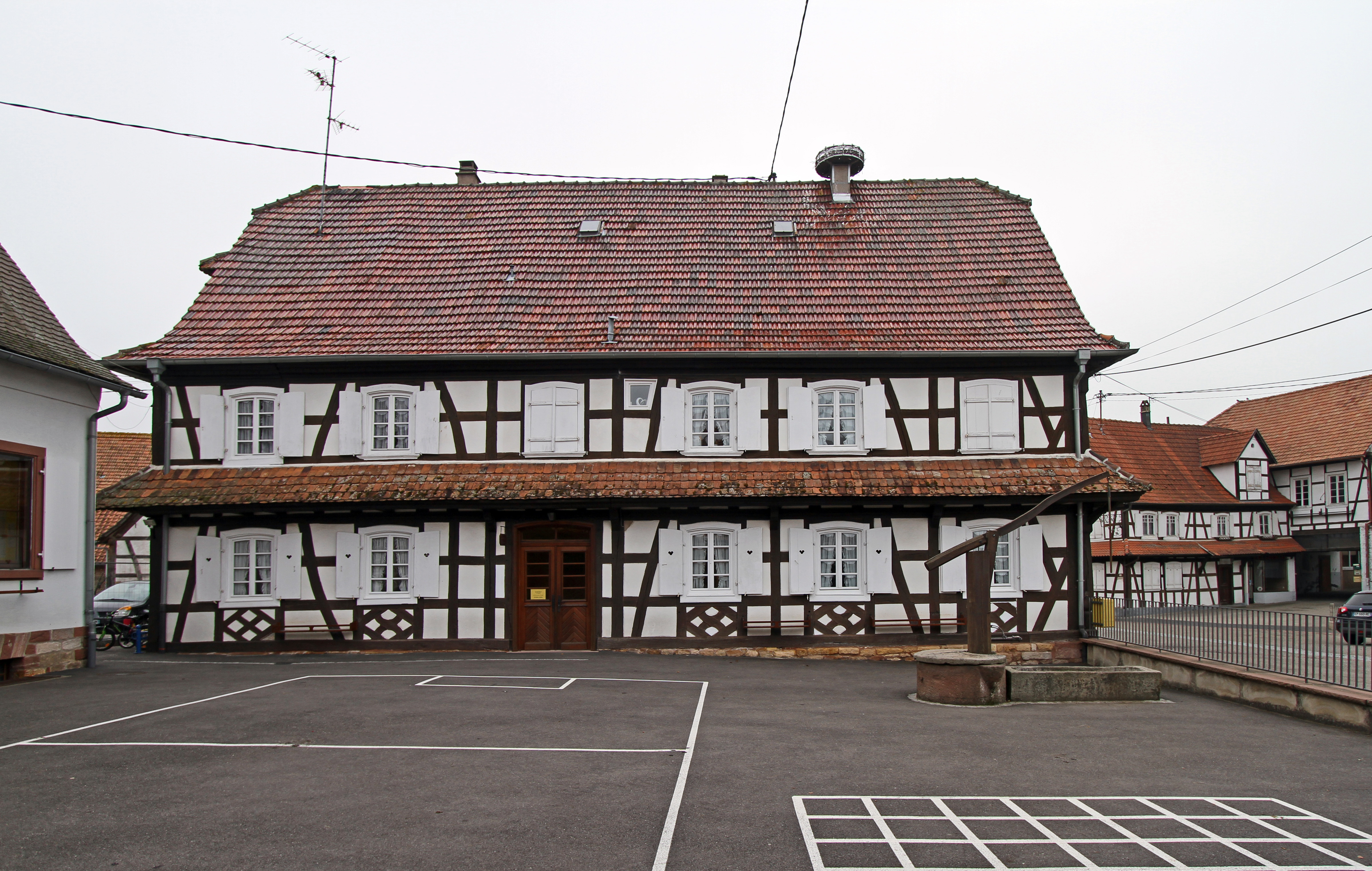

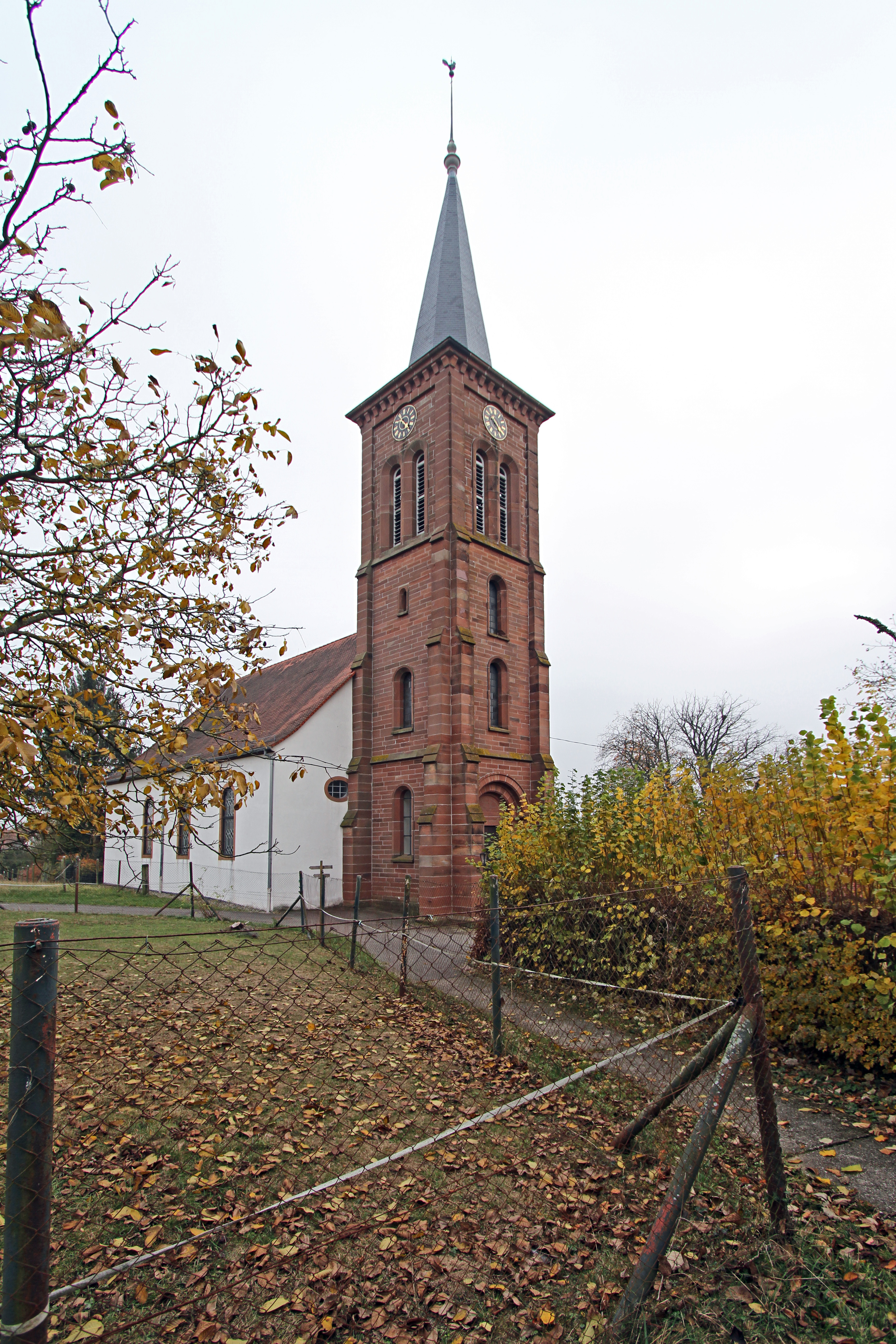

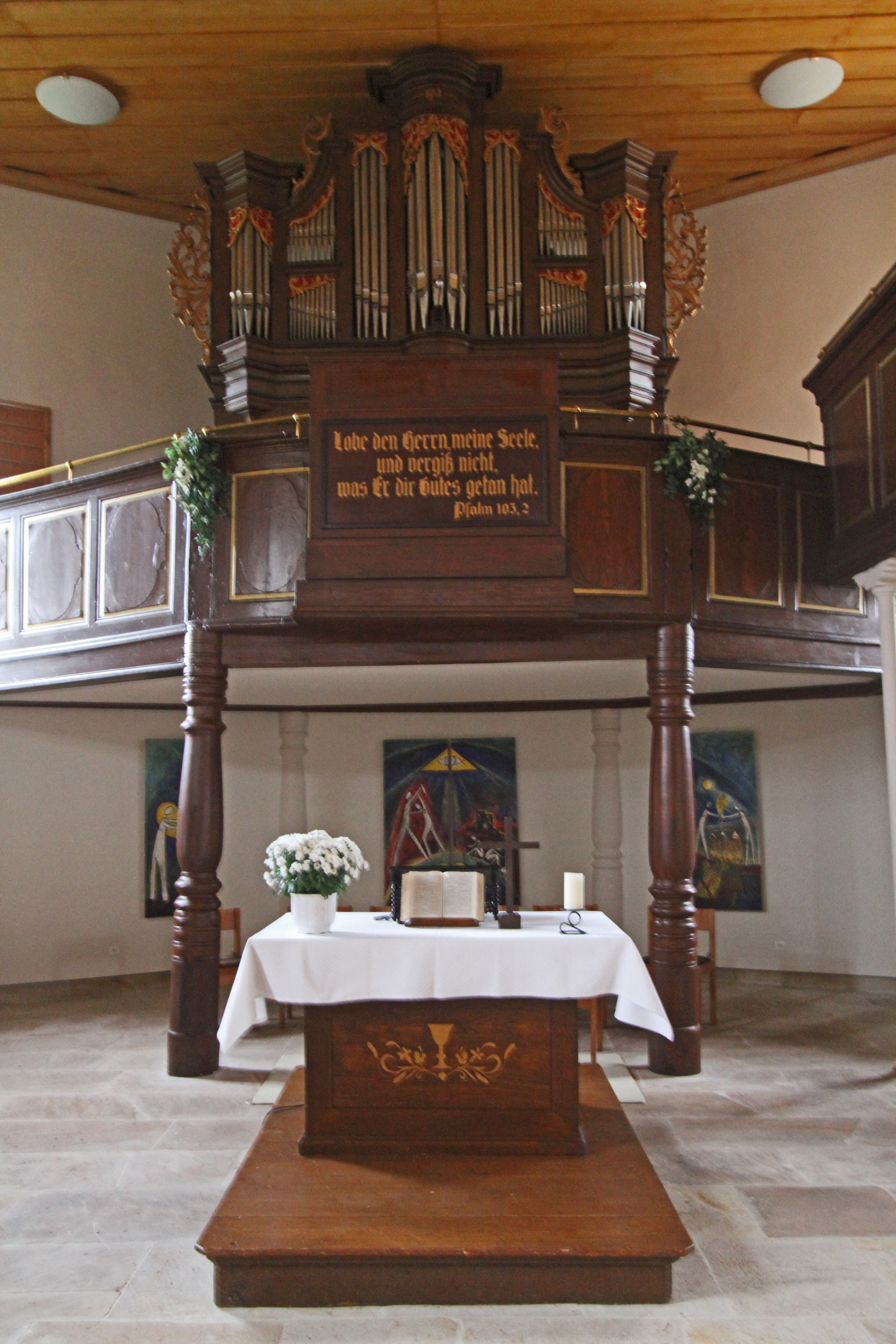

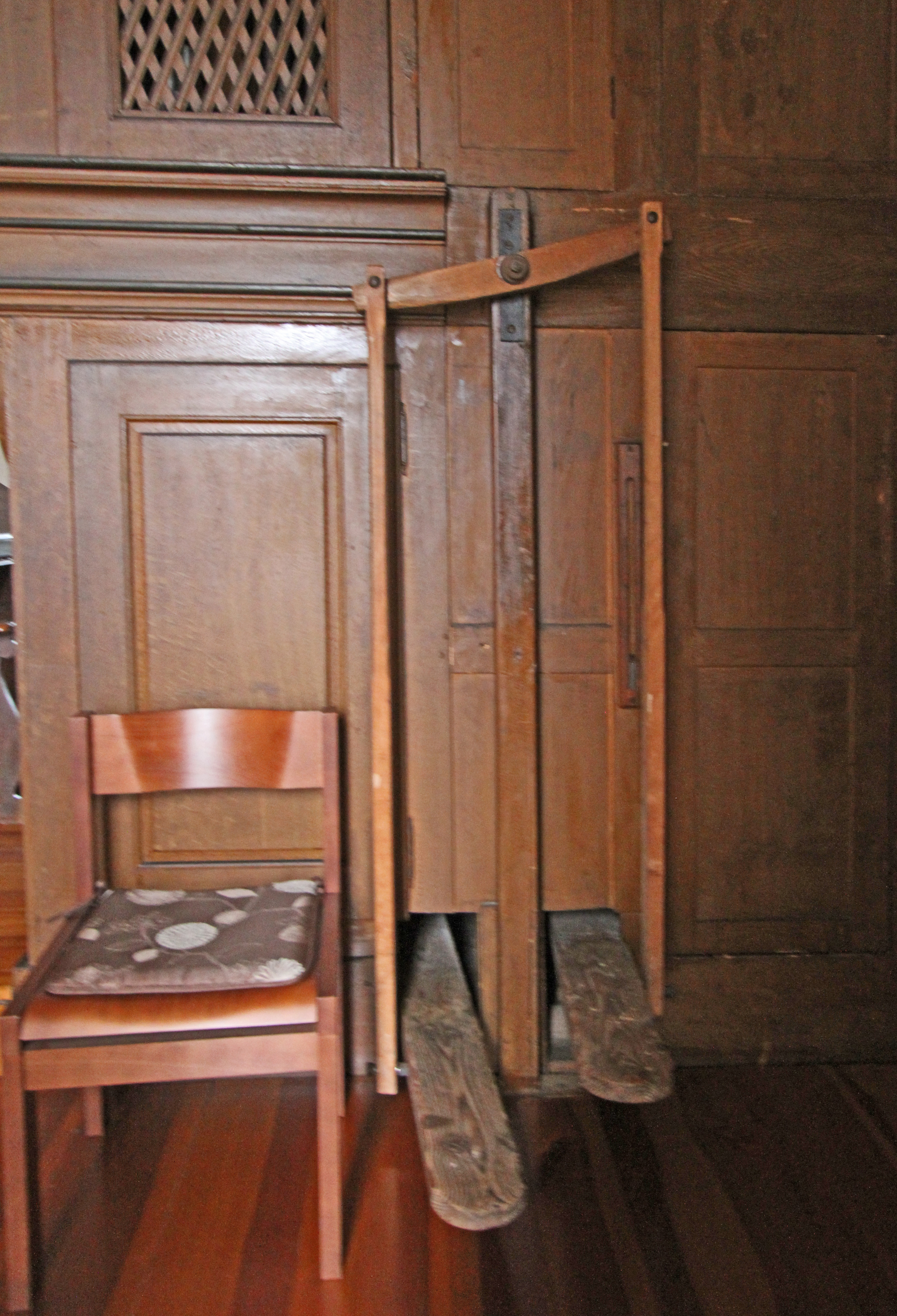

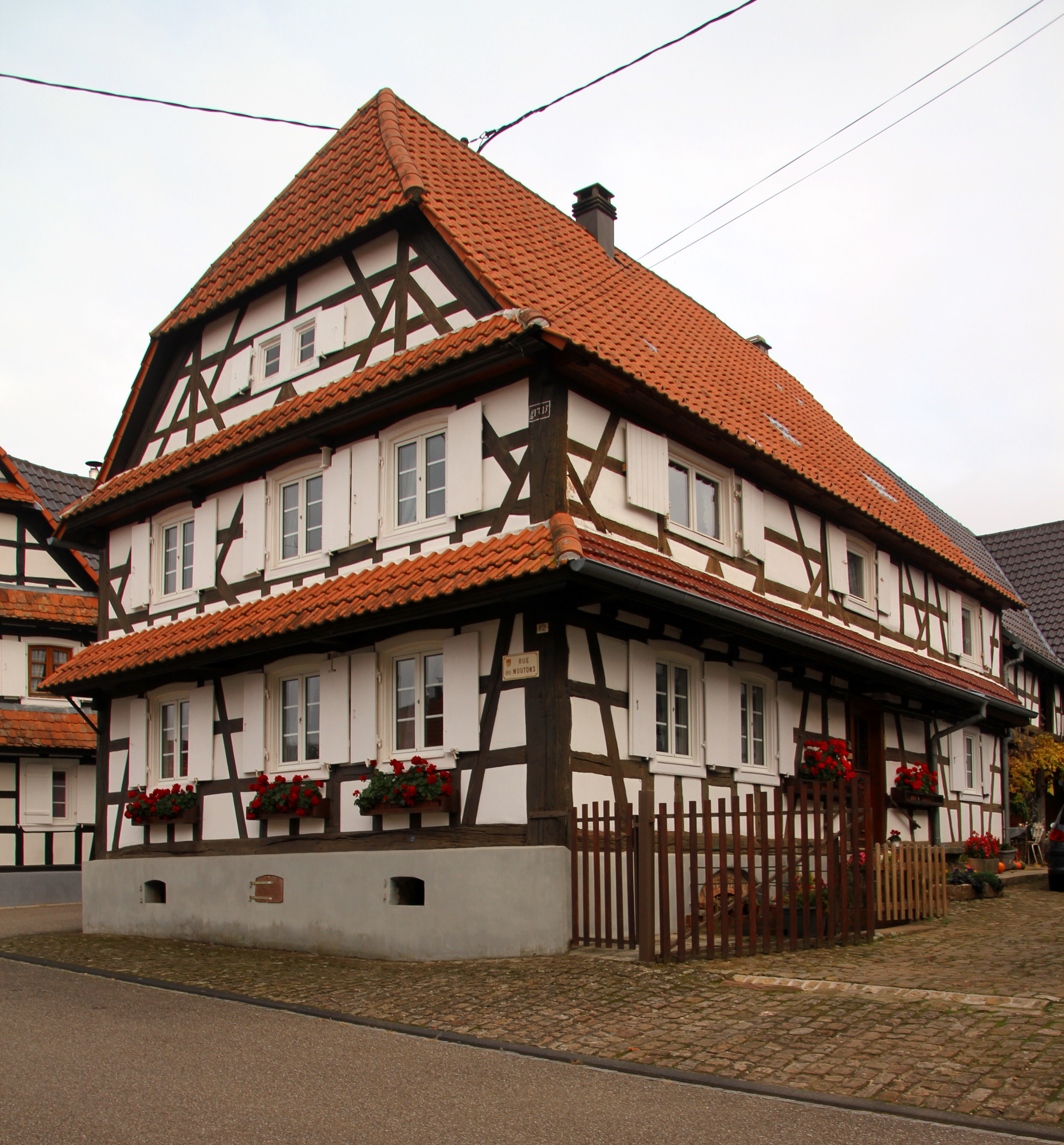

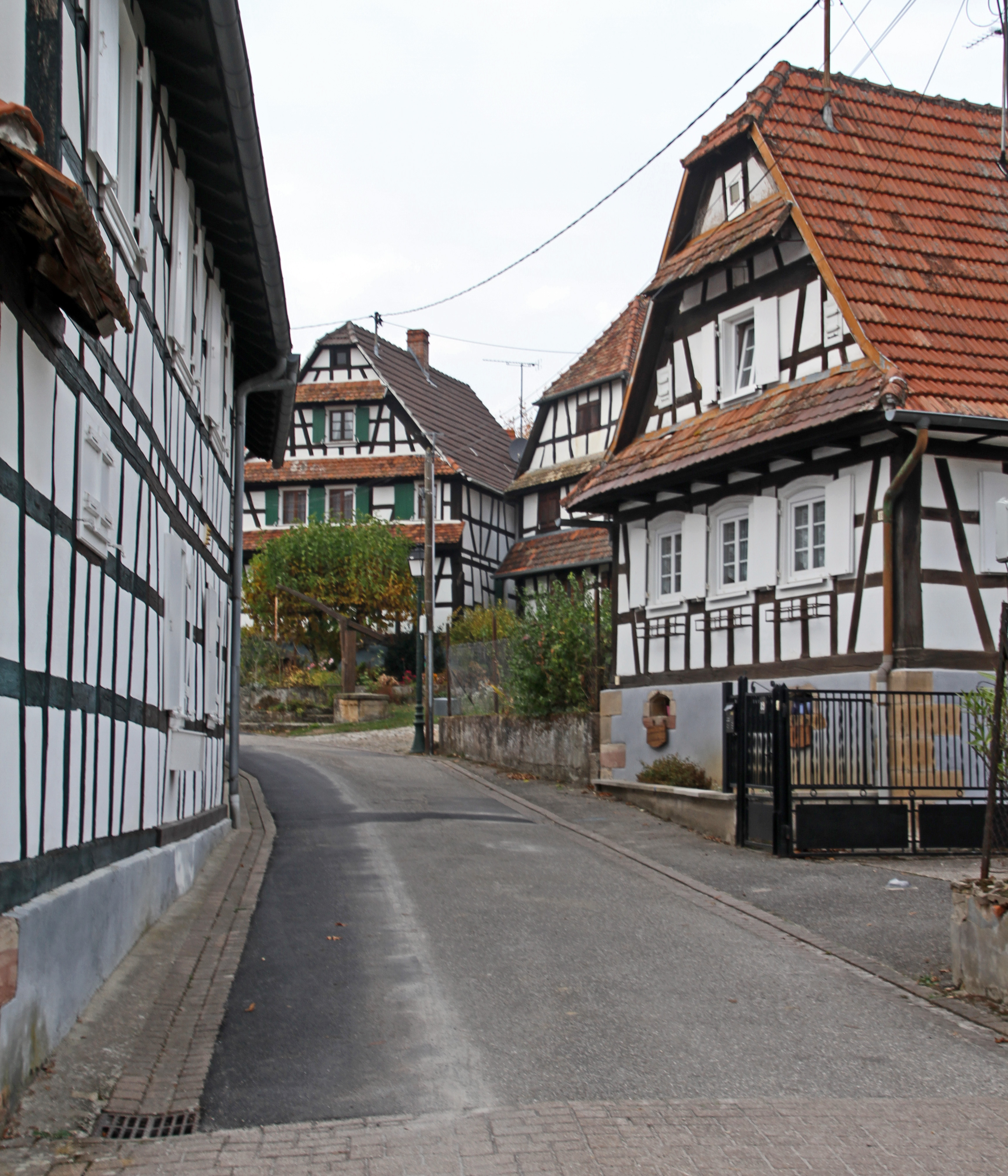

== See also ==
- Ouvrage Schoenenbourg
- Communes of the Bas-Rhin department
