= Fortified Sector of the Lower Rhine =

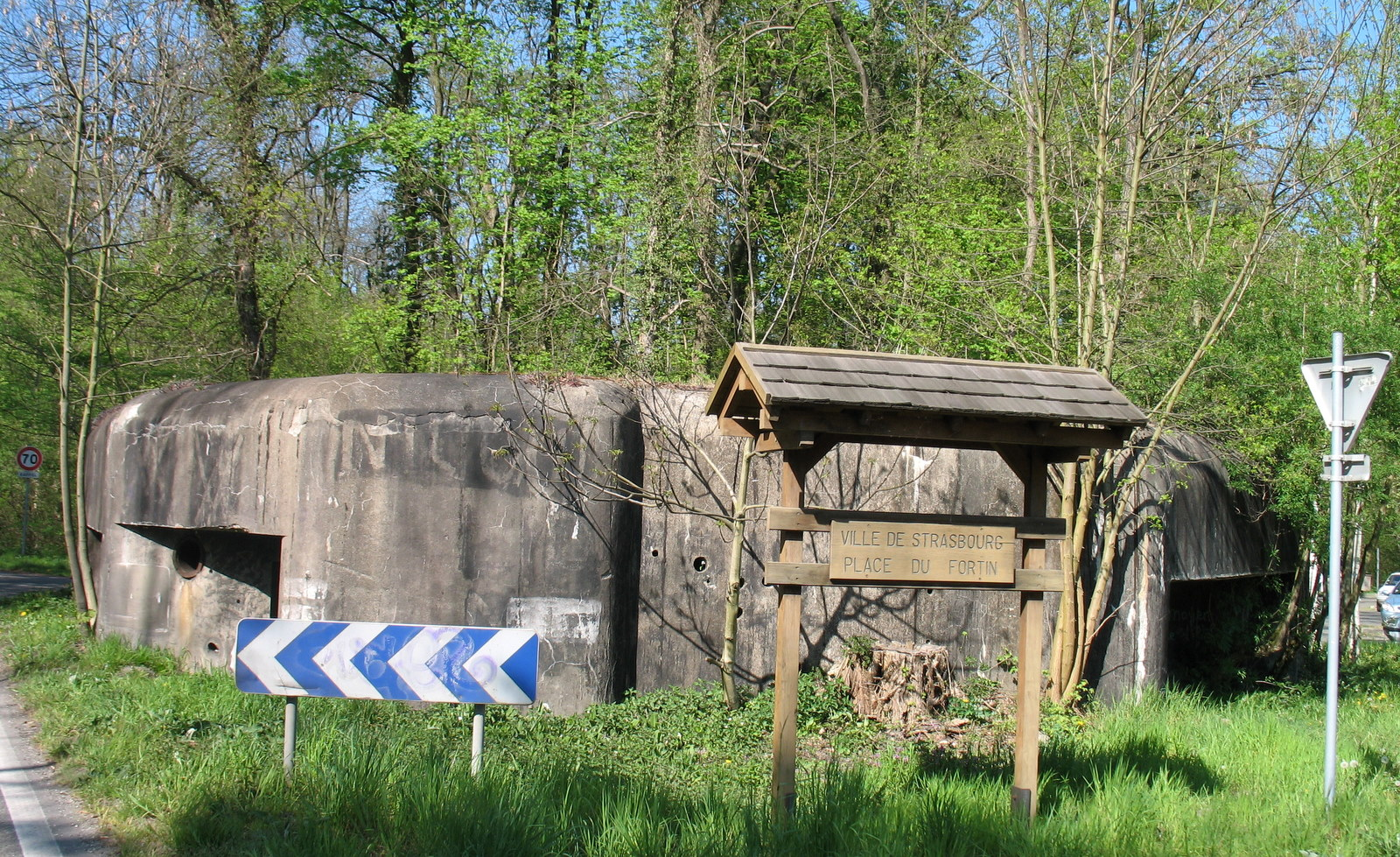
Place du fortin ("Blockhaus square") in the Robertsau forest on Strasbourg territory

The Fortified Sector of the Lower Rhine (Secteur Fortifié du Bas-Rhin) was the French military organization that in 1940 controlled the section of the French frontier with Germany in the vicinity of Strasbourg. The sector's principal defence was the Rhine itself, which could be crossed only by boat or by seizing a bridge crossing. While it was constructed by CORF, the organization responsible for the construction of the Maginot Line, the SF Lower Rhine was not a part of the core Line fortifications. The sector's fortifications chiefly took the form of individual casemates and blockhouses. Additional support was provided by the fortress ring around Strasbourg, whose fortifications were still active in 1940. The SF Lower Rhine was flanked to the north by the Fortified Sector of Haguenau and to the south by the Fortified Sector of Colmar. The Rhinau section of the SF Lower Rhine was attacked by German forces in June 1940 as a diversion from the main German invasion operation in the SF Colmar. Follow-up incursions from the north and at Strasbourg left much of the SF Lower Rhine in German hands by the armistice of 25 June.

== Concept and organization ==
The defense of the area surrounding Strasbourg benefited from the width of the Rhine and its numerous oxbows and dead arms that complicate movement on the French side of the river. As with the sectors further south, three lines of fortifications were built: a line of casemates right on the riverbank, a line of infantry shelters a few hundred metres to the rear, and a line of heavier casemates between two or three kilometres back from the riverbank. No interconnected ouvrages of the type found in sections of the main Maginot Line just to the west were built in the Lower Rhine sector. Strasbourg, directly on the riverside, could not be defended in depth, and so made do with casemates on the riverbank. Strasbourg was effectively considered an open city, as it could otherwise be easily destroyed by German artillery on the other side of the Rhine. However, some of the German festungen from the late 19th century surrounding the city were reactivated from 1935, with blockhouses at Fort Pétain, Fort Ducrot and Fort Foch. Artillery positions were placed at Fort Ullrich, Fort Ducrot and Fort Ney-Rapp. 65mm naval guns were added at six additional positions. No substantial garrison was stationed at any of the old forts, only crews sufficient to serve the arms.

The riverbank fortifications were of a basic nature, with protection only up to 155mm caliber, machine gun armament and no electrical system. The second and third lines were more robust in construction and equipment, with electric generators and anti-tank weapons.

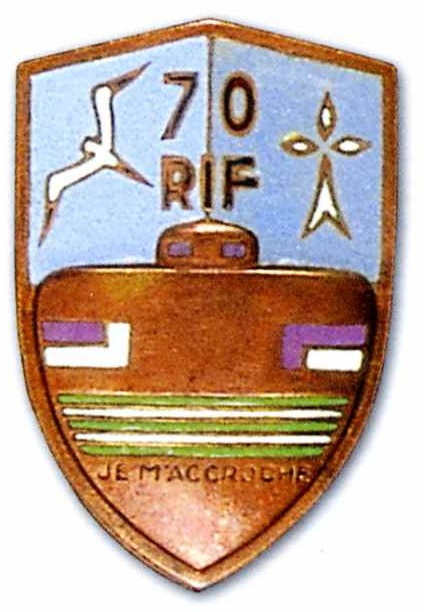
Insignia of the 70th RIF.

== Command ==
The Lower Rhine sector was under the overall command of the French 5th Army, headquartered at Wangenbourg, under the command of General Bourret, which was in turn part of Army Group 2 under General André-Gaston Prételat. The SF Lower Rhine was commanded by General Pichon, then General Renondeau from 5 January 1940, then General Vallée from 28 May. The command was located at Fort Ducrot in Mundolsheim. Artillery support for the sector was provided by the 155rd Position Artillery Regiment (Régiment d'Artillerie de Position (RAP)), which controlled both fixed and mobile artillery, commanded by Lieutenant Colonel Agabriel. Fortress infantry units included the 34th and 172nd Fortress Infantry Regiments under Lieutenant Colonel s Brocard and Le Mouël, respectively. A variety of other units were attached to the sector, including three battalions of the 237th Infantry Regiment of the Fortified Sector under Lieutenant Colonel Vigneron. The Strasbourg (Place de Strasbourg) area was garrisoned by the 226th Infantry Regiment of the Fortified Sector under Lieutenant Colonel Marteau, and the 205th Regional Regiment.

The interval troops, the army formations that were to provide the mobile defence for the sector, to support and be supported by the fixed defences, were under the command of the 17th Corps (17e Corps d'Armee), General Noël, commander. The 6th Corps in turn comprised the 62nd Infantry Division under General Sarrebourse de la Guillonère. The 62nd ID was a Class B reserve formation, not suitable for heavy or sustained combat.

The sector became the 103rd Fortress Infantry Division from 5 March 1940, also known as the Strasbourg Division. At this time the Herrlisheim sub-sector passed to the control of the neighboring Fortified Sector of Haguenau. At the midpoint of the Battle of France on 1 June 1940, the fortress troops of the 103rd DIF amounted to two fortress infantry regiments in four battalions plus one regular infantry regiment with three battalions, comprising 485 officers and 15,500 men.

== Description ==
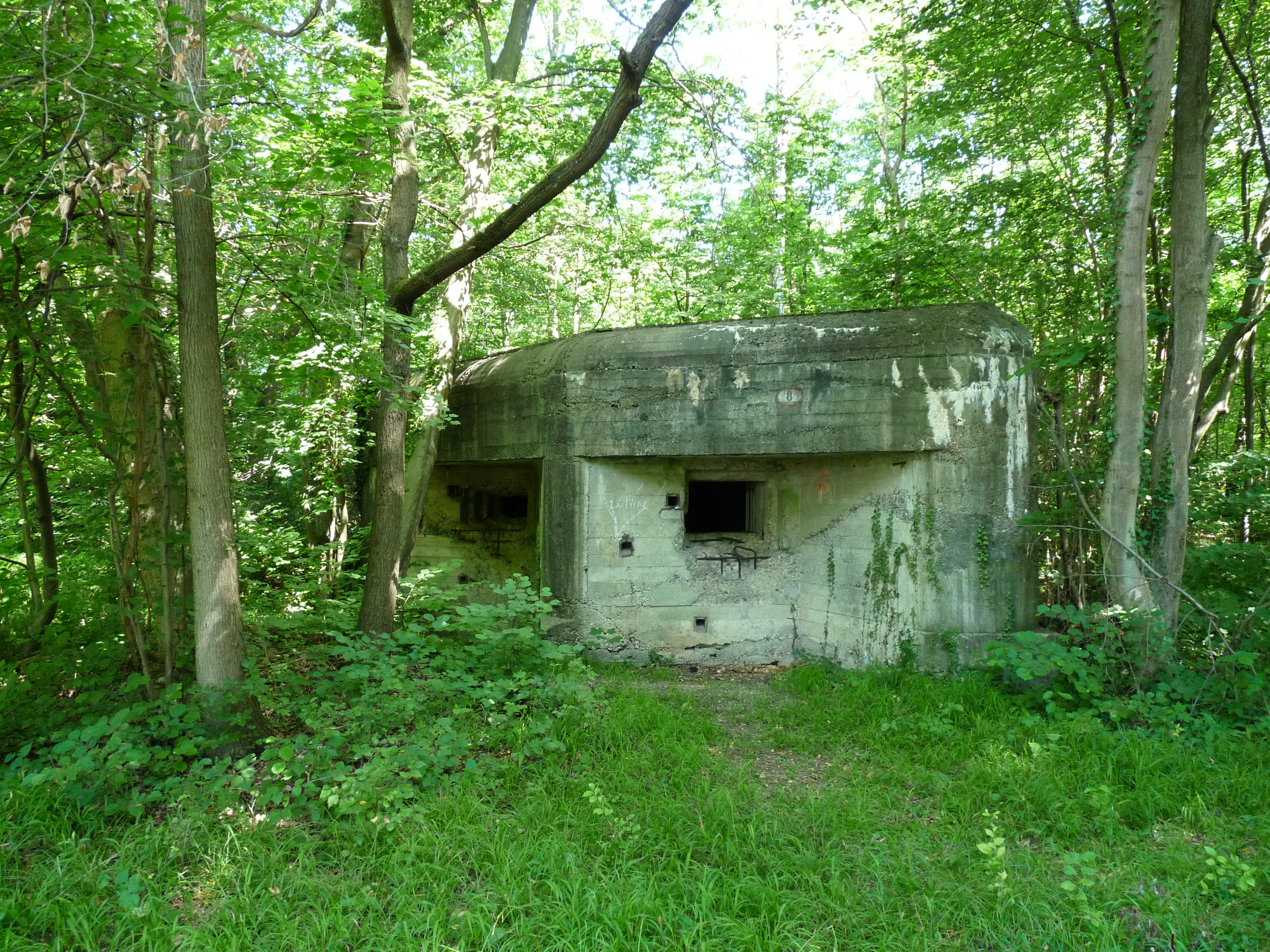
Blockhaus in the Robertsau forest

The sector includes the following major fortified positions. The casemates were generally about 800 metres (2,600 ft) apart, with gaps in areas of marshy ground or old sections of the Rhine.

=== Sub-sector of Herrlisheim ===
- Positions listed in the Fortified Sector of Haguenau.

=== Sub-sector of Strasbourg ===
172nd Fortress Infantry Regiment (172^{e} Régiment d'Infanterie de Forteresse (RIF)), Lt. Colonel Le Mouel, command post at Fort Pétain, then Schiltigheim.

==== Quartier de Robertsau (CEC 3) ====
First line (riverbank)

- Casemate de Kintzig Nord
- Casemate de Kintzig Sud
- Casemate du Bassin-aux-Pétroles
- Casemate de Sporeninsil (Île-des-Épis)
- Casemate du Bassin-de-l'Industrie
- Blockhaus des Ponts-de-Kehl
- Casemate du Champ-de-Courses
- Casemate du Petit-Rhin

==== Quartier de Neuhof (CEC 4) ====
First line (riverbank)

- Casemate de Musau
- Casemate de Ruchau
- Casemate de Hackmessergrund
- Casemate de Rohrschollen
- Casemate de Paysans
- Blockhaus de l'Auberge
- Casemate de Christian
- Casemate du Petit-Rhin

Third line (villages)

- Casemate de Stall (18/3)
- Casemate de Cosaques (19/3)

=== Sub-sector of Erstein ===
34th Fortress Infantry Regiment (34^{e} Régiment d'Infanterie de Forteresse (RIF)), Lt. Colonel Brocart.

==== Quartier de Krafft (CEC 5) ====
First line (riverbank)

- Casemate de Gerstheim Nord
- Casemate de Gerstheim Centre
- Casemate de Gerstheim Sud

Second line (shelters)

- Abri de Langkopf (10/2)
- Abri de Langgrund (10bis/2)

Third line (villages)

- Casemate de Plobsheim (20/3)
- Casemate de la Tuilerie-d'En-Haut (21/3)
- Casemate de Gerstheim (22/3)

==== Quartier de Boofzheim (CEC 6) ====
First line (riverbank)

- Casemate de Rhinau Nord
- Casemate de Rhinau Centre
- Casemate de Rhinau Sud

Third line (villages)

- Casemate du Moulin d'Obenheim (23/3)
- Casemate de Ziegelhof (24/3)
- Casemate de Neuergraben (25/3)
- Casemate de Friesenheim (27/3)
- Casemate d'Oberweidt (27bis/3)

Peacetime barracks and support:

- Casernement de Boofzheim
- Casernement de Diebolsheim

== History ==
=== Battle of France ===
The French Rhine defences did not see significant action until the middle of June 1940. By this time the main French army was in full retreat. The casemate lines along the Rhine were not supported by significant mobile forces or field artillery, which had been diverted to more urgent tasks. The casemates were designed to be mutually supporting, with fields of fire along the Rhine rather than across it. The first line was exposed to enemy fire from across the Rhine, a distance of a few hundred metres. German forces, under General Dollmann, amounted to seven divisions of the Seventh Army, supported by about three hundred artillery pieces, chiefly concentrated opposite the SF Colmar, just to the south.

The codename Kleiner Bär ("Little Bear"or "Lesser Bear") was given to the planned German cross-Rhine operation. The initial attack started at 0900 (some sources say 1000) on 15 June with artillery bombardments. 8.8 cm guns concentrated on the French positions just across the river, destroying many in a few minutes. At 0920 the first assault crossed the river, composed of the German 218th Infantry Division at Schoenau, the 221st Infantry Division at Limbourg and the 239th Infantry Division at Sponeck, all in the SF Colmar. Supporting operations were carried out by the 554th ID at Neuf-Brisach (SF Colmar) and the 557th ID at Rhinau in the Lower Rhine sector. The 557th ID's attack at Rhinau was intended to be a diversionary attack, but it produced significant success. The artillery bombardment and infantry attack destroyed most French positions, with only Casemate Rhinau Sud holding out through the day. Most positions suffered a fate similar to Rhinau Nord, which was quickly overcome by the attackers with one French death.

The German bridgehead was extended on 16 June, with a general withdrawal by French forces in the SF Colmar, leaving the Lower Rhine guarding the rear of the SF Haguenau and SF Vosges. The Germans continued to systematically assault and capture positions moving north from Rhinau. Meanwhile, the German 165th ID, having penetrated the main Maginot Line at the weakly defended Sarre sector, moved south into the SF Lower Rhine. The German 555th ID crossed the Rhine on 21 June and occupied Strasbourg.

From then until the armistice took effect on 25 June, there was little additional movement.

==== Units ====
The 172nd RIF was stationed along the riverside between Drusenheim and Rhinau. The regiment traded fire with German positions across the Rhine through the winter. The regiment's interval units received orders to fall back to the Bruche valley in the Vosges on 13 June. The riverside units retreated 18 June. The regiment surrendered 23–24 June in the area between Schirmeck and Rothau.

=== 1944 ===
As Allied forces approached the Rhine in November 1944, the Germans destroyed many of the bankside fortifications that had escaped damage in 1940.

== Present status ==
Most of the Rhine defences were simply abandoned after World War II. Most of the first line of blockhouses on the banks of the river were destroyed when the river was widened as part of navigational improvements in the 1970s. Many village line positions remain, but have been stripped by salvagers.

== Bibliography ==
- Allcorn, William. The Maginot Line 1928-45. Oxford: Osprey Publishing, 2003. ISBN 1-84176-646-1
- Kaufmann, J.E. and Kaufmann, H.W. Fortress France: The Maginot Line and French Defenses in World War II, Stackpole Books, 2006. ISBN 0-275-98345-5
- Kaufmann, J.E., Kaufmann, H.W., Jancovič-Potočnik, A. and Lang, P. The Maginot Line: History and Guide, Pen and Sword, 2011. ISBN 978-1-84884-068-3
- Mary, Jean-Yves; Hohnadel, Alain; Sicard, Jacques. Hommes et Ouvrages de la Ligne Maginot, Tome 1. Paris, Histoire & Collections, 2001. ISBN 2-908182-88-2 (in French)
- Mary, Jean-Yves; Hohnadel, Alain; Sicard, Jacques. Hommes et Ouvrages de la Ligne Maginot, Tome 3. Paris, Histoire & Collections, 2003. ISBN 2-913903-88-6 (in French)
- Mary, Jean-Yves; Hohnadel, Alain; Sicard, Jacques. Hommes et Ouvrages de la Ligne Maginot, Tome 5. Paris, Histoire & Collections, 2009. ISBN 978-2-35250-127-5 (in French)
- Romanych, Marc; Rupp, Martin. Maginot Line 1940: Battles on the French Frontier. Oxford: Osprey Publishing, 2010. ISBN 1-84176-646-1
