= Casemate d'Esch =

- Part of Fortified Sector of Haguenau, Maginot Line
- Northeast France
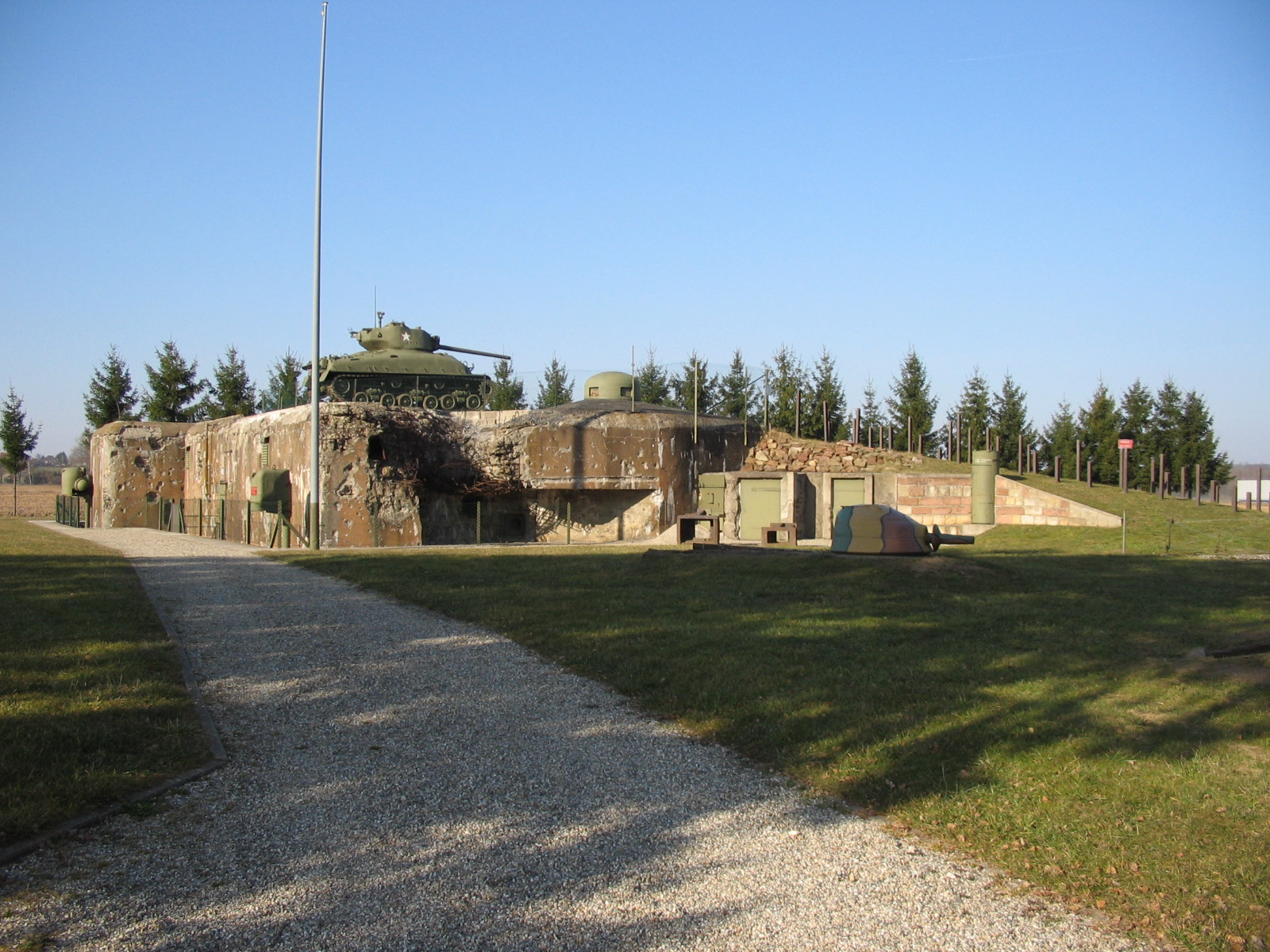

Site information
- Controlled by: France
- Open to the public: Yes
- Condition: Preserved

Location
- Coordinates: 48.8928781°N 7.9902903°E

Site history
- Built: 1931
- Built by: CORF
- Materials: Concrete, steel
- Battles/wars: Battle of France, Operation Nordwind

The Casemate d'Esch is a pre-World War II fortified position near the German frontier in extreme northeastern France. Built in 1931, the casemate was part of an extension of the Maginot Line fortifications along France's border with Germany. As a unit of the Fortified Sector of Haguenau, the casemate was part of French defenses during the Battle of France, but saw no combat in 1940. The area was the scene of intense fighting between German and American forces in 1945. The casemate with the marks of the 1945 combat has been preserved and is part of a museum associated with the nearby Ouvrage Schoenenbourg. The museum is located at the southeastern edge of the town of Hatten.

== Concept and design ==
Esch was built in 1931 by the Commission d'Organisation des Régions Fortifiées (CORF), which was responsible for the major fortifications of the Maginot Line. Esch was one of the first of a series of casemates extending east from the last major position in the Maginot Line, Ouvrage Schoenenbourg. Cost was about 1.06 million francs of the time. The casemate line formed a barrier across the Alsace Plain between the Vosges Mountains, whose last outlier was at Schoenenbourg, and the Rhine River.

The Esch casemate is a double casemate on one level, designed to fire laterally in either direction along the front, supporting its neighbors to the east and west. The position was armed with two twin heavy machine guns, type JM and, two 47mm anti-tank gun/JM combinations, one of each firing laterally. These embrasures were covered by automatic rifle ports firing across their fronts. A projecting caponier defended the entrance with automatic rifle fire, with an additional firing port to the north. On top of the fort, two GFM cupolas or cloches armed with automatic rifles were situated to fire in all directions. The casemate measures approximately 28 metres (92 ft) by 18 metres (59 ft), and is 7.5 metres (25 ft) high. Concrete thickness varied from 2.5 metres (8.2 ft) at the front to 1-metre (3.3 ft) at the rear. The casemate occupies a small hill, presenting an earth embankment studded with anti-tank rails to the north. Its name is derived from the name of the locale in the Alsatian dialect, signifying a farmer's harrow.

== Manning ==
Esch was garrisoned by 21 troops, commanded by an officer and two non-commissioned officers. The garrison was part of the 5th company of the 23rd Fortress Infantry Regiment. The commanding officer in 1940 was Sub-lieutenant Barthet.

== History ==
See Fortified Sector of Haguenau for a broader discussion of the Haguenau sector of the Maginot Line.

=== 1940 ===
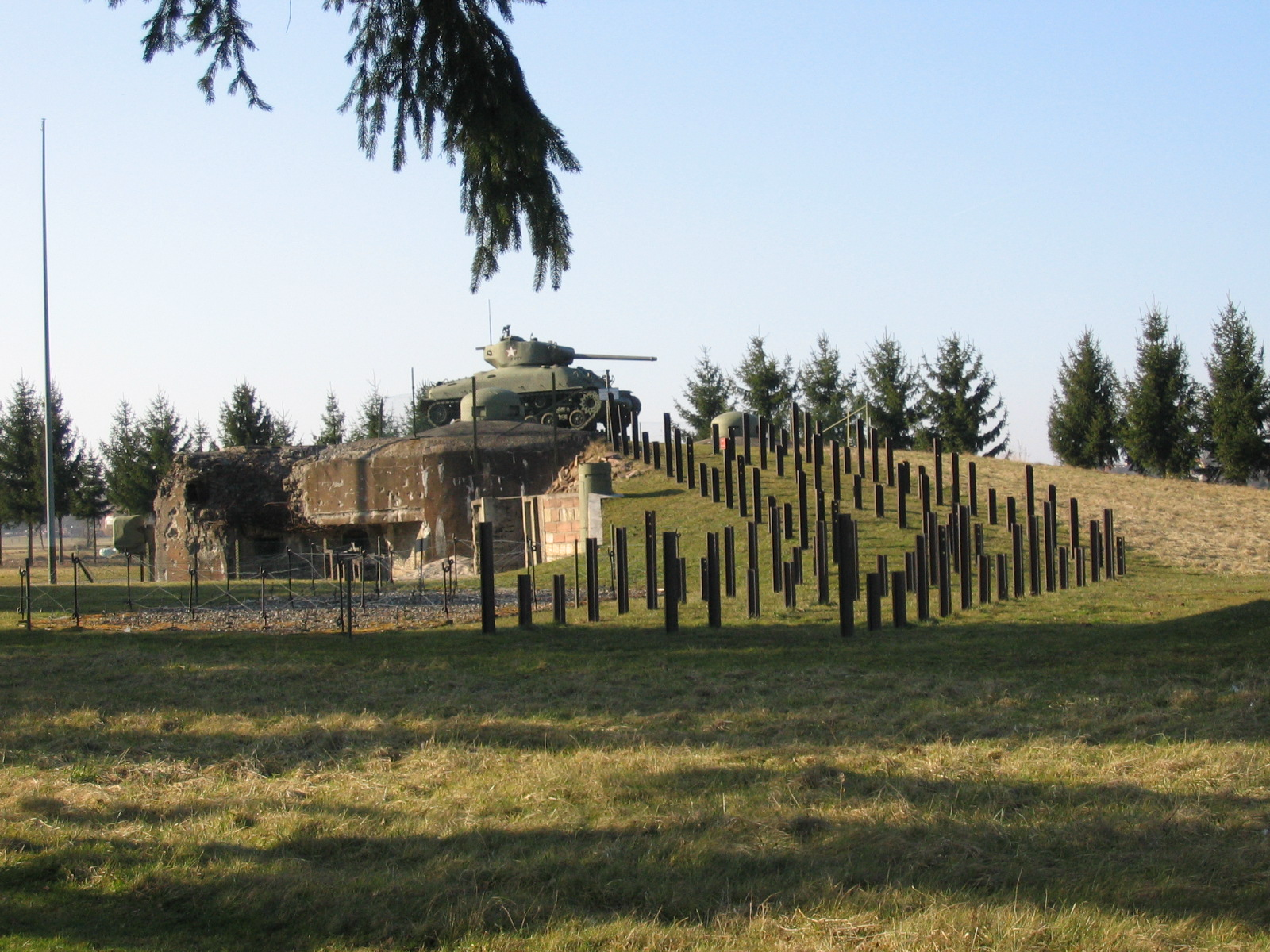
Anti-tank rails

On 19/20 June, German forces of the 246th Infantry Division made a concentrated attack on the casemate line around Hoffen, which failed to penetrate the fortifications. A second attempt focused on Hatten, at the limit of firing range for the large artillery positions to the west. The casemates around Hatten, were first attacked on 24 June from the south, by the 215th Infantry Division which had circled back after passing to the rear of the Maginot Line. The 25 June armistice stopped all fighting before Esch could see combat. The garrison finally surrendered with the others in its sector on 1 July 1940, six days after the armistice.

=== 1945 ===
The casemate came under fire in January 1945, when the Hatten area was the scene of fighting between American and German forces during the German Operation Nordwind offensive. German forces included the 25th Panzergrenadier Division and the 21st Panzer Division. American forces, principally the US 14th Armored Division, retreated south to the casemate line and dug in among the casemates. Fighting around Hatten began on 8 January and continued until 21 January, when the Americans pulled back to Haguenau. Casualties among the 14th Armored included 104 dead, 112 missing and 899 wounded. and 83 casualties among the inhabitants of Hatten. The Esch casemate was heavily damaged in the fighting. The area was recaptured by the Tabors Marocains of the French First Army on 18 March 1945.

== Museum ==
The damaged casemate remained abandoned until 1982, when it was restored by the Association des Amis de la Ligne Maginot d'Alsace (Alsace Association of Friends of the Maginot Line), who would go on in 1987 to begin work on the nearby Ouvrage Schoenenbourg. Esch has been open for tours since 1986. An American M4 Sherman tank was placed on top of the casemate as a memorial to the 1945 actions.

== Bibliography ==
- Allcorn, William. The Maginot Line 1928-45. Oxford: Osprey Publishing, 2003. ISBN 1-84176-646-1
- Degon, André; Zylberyng, Didier, "La Ligne Maginot: Guide des Forts à Visiter," Editions Ouest-France, 2014. ISBN 978-2-7373-6080-0 (in French)
- Kaufmann, J.E. and Kaufmann, H.W. Fortress France: The Maginot Line and French Defenses in World War II, Stackpole Books, 2006. ISBN 0-275-98345-5
- Kaufmann, J.E., Kaufmann, H.W., Jancovič-Potočnik, A. and Lang, P. The Maginot Line: History and Guide, Pen and Sword, 2011. ISBN 978-1-84884-068-3
- Mary, Jean-Yves; Hohnadel, Alain; Sicard, Jacques. Hommes et Ouvrages de la Ligne Maginot, Tome 1. Paris, Histoire & Collections, 2001. ISBN 2-908182-88-2 (in French)
- Mary, Jean-Yves; Hohnadel, Alain; Sicard, Jacques. Hommes et Ouvrages de la Ligne Maginot, Tome 2. Paris, Histoire & Collections, 2003. ISBN 2-908182-97-1 (in French)
- Mary, Jean-Yves; Hohnadel, Alain; Sicard, Jacques. Hommes et Ouvrages de la Ligne Maginot, Tome 3. Paris, Histoire & Collections, 2003. ISBN 2-913903-88-6 (in French)
- Mary, Jean-Yves; Hohnadel, Alain; Sicard, Jacques. Hommes et Ouvrages de la Ligne Maginot, Tome 5. Paris, Histoire & Collections, 2009. ISBN 978-2-35250-127-5 (in French)
