= Casemate de Rountzenheim Sud =

Casemate of the Maginot Line

Coordinates: 48°49′35″N 8°00′36″E

- Part of Maginot Line
- Northeast France
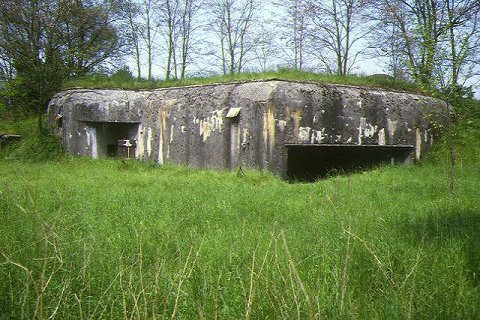
- Rear elevation

Site information
- Controlled by: France

Site history
- In use: Abandoned
- Materials: Concrete, steel
- Battles/wars: Battle of France

See Fortified Sector of Haguenau for a broader discussion of the Haguenau sector of the Maginot Line.

The Casemate de Rountzenheim Sud is an interval infantry casemate of the Maginot Line. The casemate is in the town of Rœschwoog in France, behind the campsite, to the south of the railway.

== Description ==
The casemate is a simple flanking one, meaning that it has only one firing chamber which is directed towards the north. It has an underground gallery connecting to its neighbour, the Casemate de Rountzenheim Nord. It was built in 1932 to accommodate 15 troops, a warrant officer and an officer. Its dimensions are: 19 by 14 metres, for 7.5 metres in height. The top concrete measures 2 metres in thickness and the external walls 2.25 metres for the exposed walls and 1 metre for the back walls.

The interior is organised on only one level, with:

- An entrance corridor
- A restroom
- A firing chamber
- A latrine
- An access shaft to the underground gallery
- A water reserve

== Armament ==
For its close defence, the casemate has two light machine guns of 7.5 mm and a GFM cloche. One machine gun protects the entrance door, and the other is at the embrasure of the firing chamber and the diamant ditch.

In the firing chamber are two twin 7.5 mm machine guns, one of them may be replaced by a 37 mm anti-tank gun.

A 50 mm mortar could be fitted to GFM cloche.
