= Casemate d'Auenheim Nord =

Infantry casemate of the Maginot Line located in Alsace, France

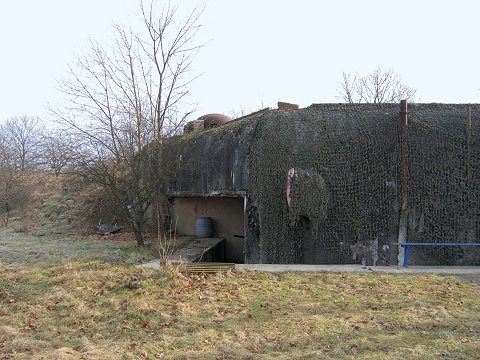
- The back frontage, shooting room

Site history
- Built: 1932

See Fortified Sector of Haguenau for a broader discussion of the Haguenau sector of the Maginot Line.

Casemate d'Auenheim Nord is an infantry casemate of the Maginot Line located in the town of Auenheim, in Alsace.

== Description ==
The casemate is a simple flanking one built in 1932 to take in an officer, a non-commissioned officer and 20 troops.

== Organisation ==
Entrance with an armoured door, shooting room, a room for filters, a room for the electric power supply, 2 restrooms and a latrine.

== Armament ==
- 37 mm antitank gun
- 3 twinings of machine-gun of 7.5 mm
- 5 rifle machine-guns
- 2 50 mm mortars
- grenade launchers

== Notes and references ==
(in French) The Maginot Line website
