= Casemate de Rountzenheim Nord =

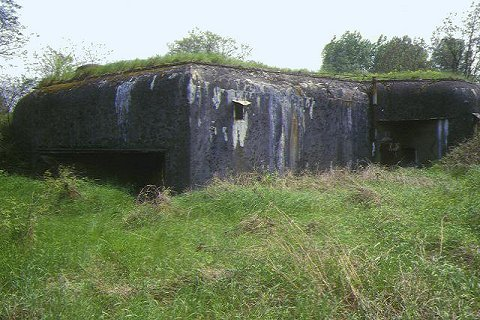
- The back frontage and crenels

Location
- Coordinates: 48°49′38″N 08°00′36″E

The Casemate de Rountzenheim Nord is a casemate of interval infantry of the Maginot Line. The casemate is in the town of Rœschwoog in France, behind the camping site, in the north of the railway.

== Description ==
The casemate is a simple flanking one, meaning that it has only one shooting room which is directed towards North. It has a gallery of underground connection to its neighbour, the Casemate de Rountzenheim Sud. It was built in 1932 to accommodate 15 troops, a warrant officer and an officer. Its dimensions on the overall ground are: 19×14 metres, for 7.5 metres in height. The concrete flagstone measures 2 metres in thickness and the external walls 2,25 metres for the exposed walls and 1 metre for the back walls.

The interior is organised on only one level, consisting of the following:

- An entrance corridor
- A restroom
- A shooting room
- A latrine
- An access shaft to the underground gallery
- A water reserve

== Armament ==
For its closer defence, the casemate has two light machine guns of 7.5 mm and a cloche GFM, one machine gun located in protection of the entrance door, the other on the crenels of the shooting room and the diamant ditch.

In the shooting room, are two twinnings of machine-guns of 7.5 mm, one of them can be replaced in the event of need by an anti-tank gun of 37 mm.

A mortar of 50 mm can be adapted to the cloche GFM.
