= Ouvrage Schoenenbourg =

Maginot Line fortification

- Part of Maginot Line
- Northeast France
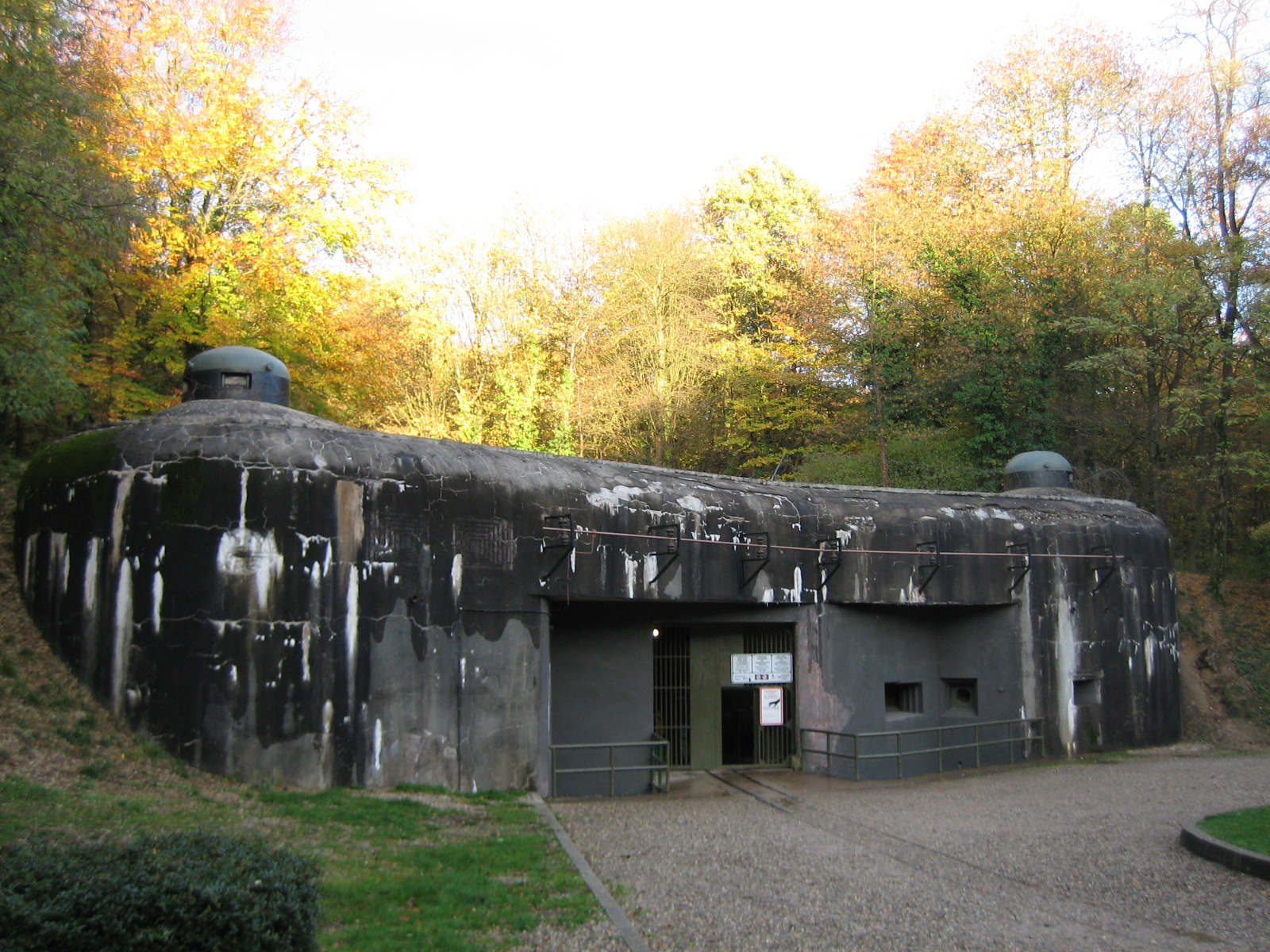
- Ammunition entrance, Block 7

Site information
- Controlled by: France
- Open to the public: Yes
- Condition: Preserved

Location
- Location within France
- Coordinates: 48.96667°N 7.91194°E

Site history
- Built by: CORF
- Materials: Concrete, steel, deep excavation
- Battles/wars: Battle of France, Lorraine Campaign

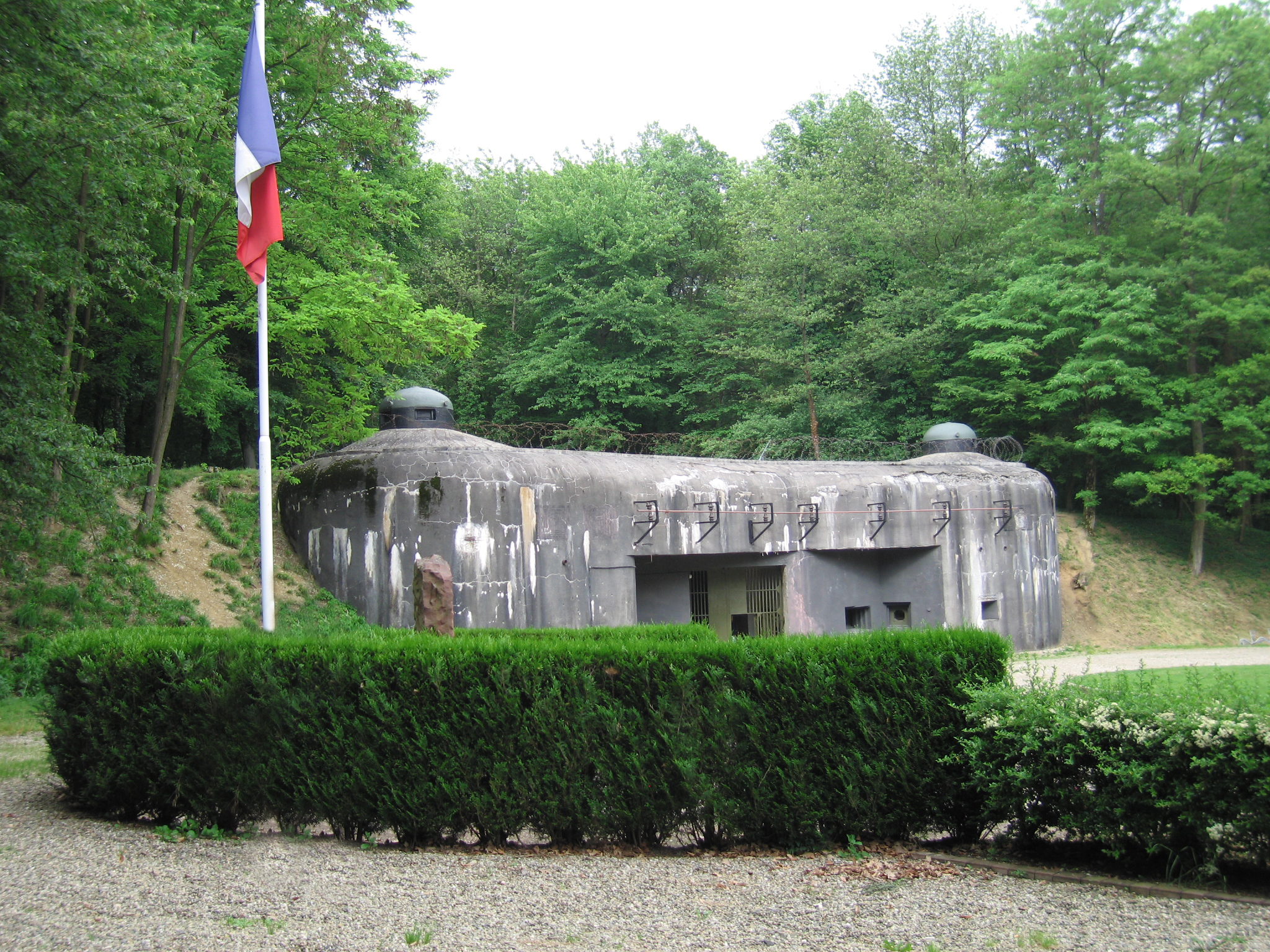
The main entrance of the Ouvrage Schoenenbourg today

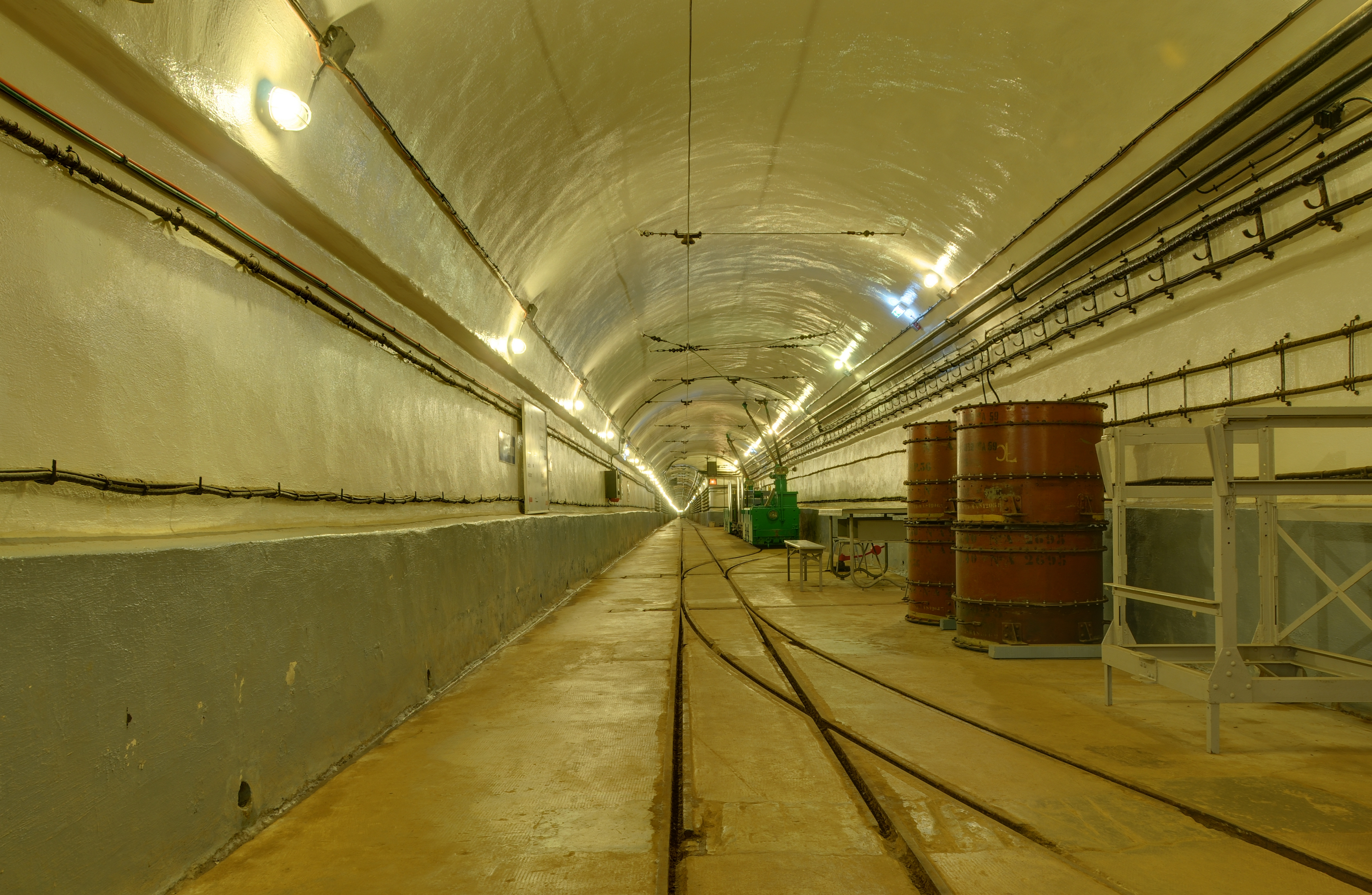
View of the railway in the Ouvrage Schoenebourg

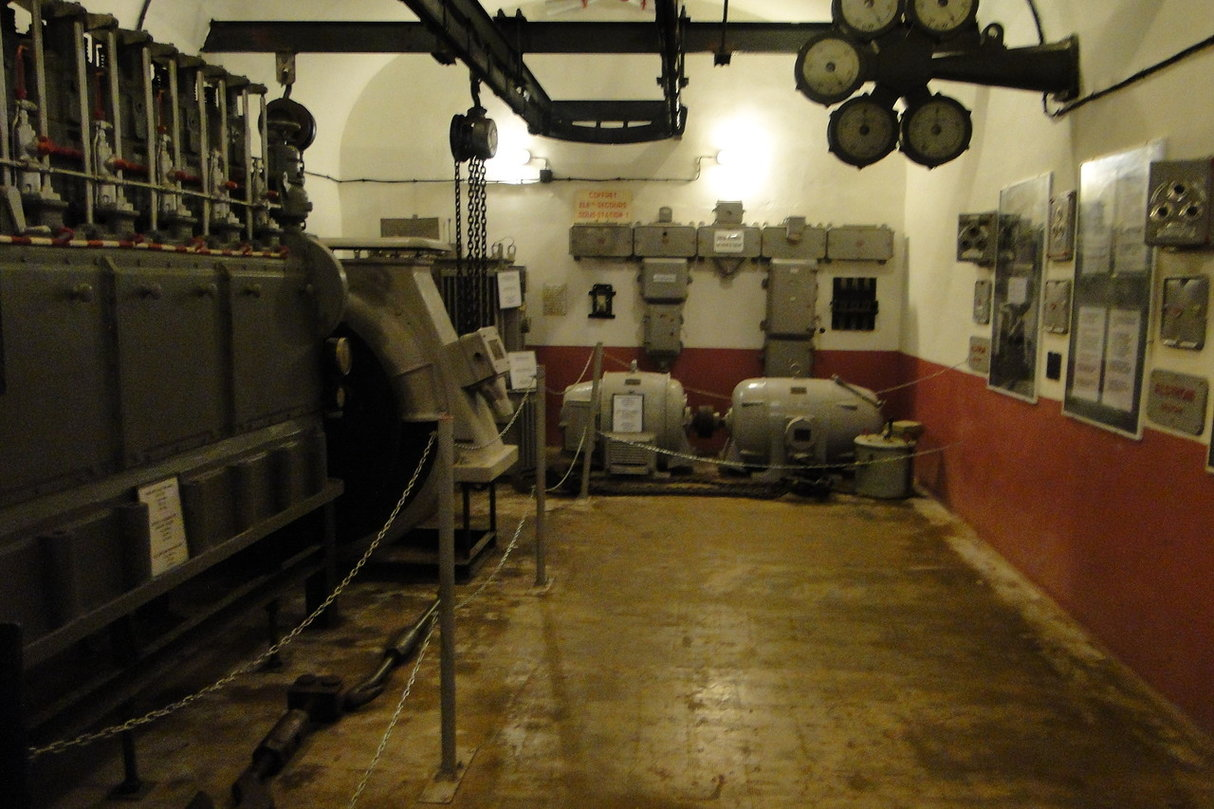
Power station in the Ouvrage Schoenenbourg

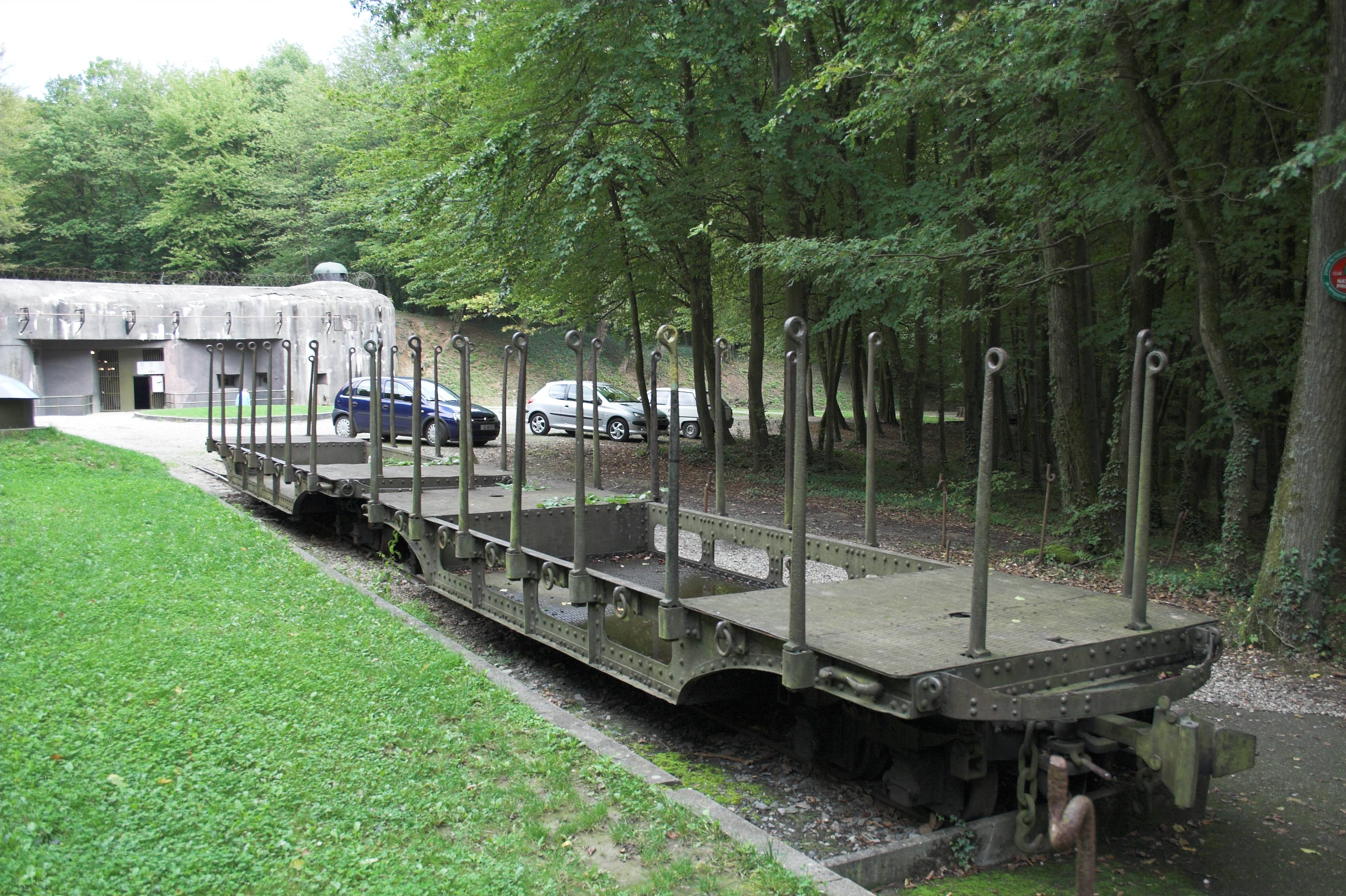
Pocket wagons at Fort Schoenenbourg Schoenenbourg, France

Ouvrage Schoenenbourg is a Maginot Line fortification. It is located on the territory of the communes of Hunspach, Schœnenbourg and Ingolsheim, in the French département of Bas-Rhin, forming part of the Fortified Sector of Haguenau, facing Germany. At the east end of the Alsace portion of the Maginot Line, its neighbour is the gros ouvrage Hochwald. It is the largest such fortification open to the public in Alsace. Officially recorded as an historical monument, it retains all its original structural elements. Schoenenbourg was heavily bombarded during the Battle of France in 1940, receiving more enemy ordnance than any other position in France, with no significant damage. In 1945, retreating German troops used explosives to destroy much of the ouvrage. After the war it was fully repaired and placed back into service as part of a programme to use Maginot fortifications to resist a potential Warsaw Pact advance through Europe. By the 1970s the plan had lost favour and funding, and Schoenenboug was abandoned. In 1987 a local organisation undertook Schoenenbourg's preservation, and today it is open to public visitation.

== Design and construction ==
The site was surveyed by CORF (Commission d'Organisation des Régions Fortifiées), the Maginot Line's design and construction agency; Schoenenbourg was approved for construction in June 1931. The gros ouvrage (Note: English-language sources use the French term ouvrage as the preferred term for the Maginot positions, in preference to "fort", a term usually reserved for older fortifications with passive defensives in the form of walls and ditches. The literal translation of ouvrage in the sense of a fortification in English is "work." A gros ouvrage is a large fortification with a significant artillery component, while a petit ouvrage is smaller, with lighter arms.) was intended to receive an additional turret in a second phase of construction, never pursued. Schoenenbourg is arranged as a typical gros ouvrage, with separate entrances for munitions and personnel almost 1,000 metres (3,300 ft) behind the closely grouped main combat blocks. Schoenenbourg lacks the large "M1" central magazine characteristic of most gros ouvrages. A total of 3 kilometres (1.9 mi) of galleries extend from 18 to 30 metres (59 to 98 ft) below the surface.

Initial plans were on a smaller scale. The 1929 original proposal was for a petit ouvrage, six blocks armed with machine guns and 75 mm guns. Blocks were added to the design until the gros ouvrage emerged. Costs in 1931 were estimated at 41.2 million francs (equivalent to €2.9 billion in 2025). Construction uncovered difficulties with the foundations, resulting in the widespread use of piles under the blocks to stabilise their support, a unique solution in the Line. The major work was completed in 1935, and equipment and armament were fitted in 1936 and 1937. Final completion took place in 1938, marked by difficulties with drainage of water infiltration.

== Description ==
The work is composed of eight blocks, with six combat blocks including two casemate blocks, a personnel entrance block and an ammunition entrance block. Underground galleries connect the blocks, extending more than 1,500 metres (4,900 ft) in length. The underground barracks and utility areas are located just inside the personnel entry. The ouvrage was served by electrified 600 mm (1 ft 11 5/8 in) narrow-gauge railways that branched from a line paralleling the front and connecting to supply depots. The rail lines ran directly into the munitions entry of the ouvrage and all the way out to the combat blocks.

- Block 1: Infantry casemate on two levels, with one twin machine gun/47 mm anti-tank gun embrasure (JM/AC47), one flanking twin machine gun and two automatic rifle cloches (GFM), as well as an emergency exit. This block was particularly difficult to supply with ammunition, since it lacked a hoist, and all ordnance had to be carried by the troops.
- Block 2: Infantry block with one retractable twin machine gun turret and one GFM cloche. As with Block 1, no ammunition hoist was provided.
- Block 3: Artillery block with one retractable twin 75 mm gun turret and one GFM cloche. The block had an ammunition hoist with a capacity of 2.5 tonnes (5,500 lb).
- Block 4: Artillery block, identical to Block 3, with an additional observation cloche (VDP).
- Block 5: Artillery block with one retractable twin 81 mm mortar turret, one GFM block and one grenade launcher cloche (LG) (never armed). The hoist capacity was 500 kg (1,100 lb).
- Block 6: Infantry casemate, identical to Block 1, with a single GFM cloche.
- Block 7: Ammunition entry with two hoists of 5 and 2.5 tonnes (11,000 and 5,500 lb) capacity, two GFM cloches, three FM automatic rifle embrasures and one JM/AC47 embrasure. Radio communications were also available at this location.
- Block 8: Personnel entry with one GFM cloche, one LG cloche, one JM/AC47 embrasure and two FM automatic rifle embrasures. Due to explosive demolition by the Germans in 1944, the block was reconstructed in 1950.

The generating plant comprised four of 165 hp (167 PS; 123 kW) Sulzer engines.

=== Casemates and shelters ===
A series of detached casemates and infantry shelters are in the vicinity of Schoenenbourg, including

- Casemate de Breitenacker Nord: Single block with one JM/AC37 embrasure, one twin machine gun embrasure and a GFM cloche.
- Casemate de Breitenacker Sud: Single block with one JM/AC37 embrasure, one twin machine gun embrasure and a GFM cloche. Breitenacker Nord and Sud are linked by an underground gallery.
- Abri de Grasserloch: Subsurface abri-caverne (Note: An abri is an infantry shelter, sometimes underground or under earth cover. An abri in the main Maginot Line often closely resembles a casemate, but is more lightly armed and can hold more occupants.) with two GFM cloches.
- Abri de Schoenenbourg: Surface abri with two GFM cloches.
- Casemate d'Ingolscheim Ouest: Single block with one JM/AC37 embrasure, one twin machine gun embrasure and a GFM cloche.
- Casemate d'Ingolscheim Est: Single block with one JM/AC37 embrasure, one twin machine gun embrasure and a GFM cloche.

== Personnel ==
The troops manning the ouvrage in 1939 under the command of Commandant Reynier comprised 491 men and 17 officers of the 22nd Fortress Infantry Regiment and the 156th Position Artillery Regiment. The units were under the umbrella of the 5th Army, Army Group 2. Interval troops covering the areas between and outside the fortifications were assigned to the 16th and 70th Infantry Divisions, 12th Corps. The nearby Casernement de Drachenbronn provided peacetime above-ground barracks and support services to Schoenenbourg and other positions in the area.

== History ==
See Fortified Sector of Haguenau for a broader discussion of the Haguenau sector of the Maginot Line.

=== 1940 ===
The fortification at Schoenenbourg is the one that saw the most combat between September 1939 and June 1940. Over this period, over 17,000 shells were fired from the fort, and it was itself the target of over 3000 shells and 160 bombs. Schoenenbourg was in action against the German 146th Infantry Division, which applied pressure along the Line. On 19 June 1940, German Stukas attacked Schoenenbourg and other ouvrages, returning on the 20th and 21st. The attacks on the 21st were joined by a bombardment with 420 mm siege mortars, lasting three days. The bombardment cracked walls, but did not disable the position. Schoenenbourg fired during this period in support of nearby casemates, not seriously affected by the bombardments. Schoenenbourg's turrets were retracted to receive the heavy shells, and raised during the lengthy reloading period for counterbattery fire. The inventory of German ordnance fired against Schoenenbourg was assessed after the armistice, and found to comprise 160 aerial bombs, 50 42 cm shells, 33 28 cm shells, and approximately 3000 smaller projectiles, the most ammunition used against any fortification in France. The final surrender of Schoenenbourg was effected on 1 July 1940, in accordance with the terms of the Second Compiègne armistice. Following the surrender Schoenenbourg was used as a backdrop for propaganda films and as an indoctrination center for Hitler Youth.

=== 1945 ===
No fighting took place in the area of Schoenenbourg during the American advances of 1945, but the retreating Germans of the 245th Infantry Division caused extensive damage in March, using explosives to wreck the entrances and turrets, along with a number of nearby casemates. The U.S. 36th Infantry Division took possession of the damaged ouvrage on 20 March 1945.

=== Cold War ===
In the 1950s interest in the Maginot Line was renewed. In 1951, Lembach, Four-à-Chaux, Hochwald and Schoenenbourg were designated the Môle de Haguenau, a point of resistance against a potential invasion by forces of the Warsaw Pact. Lembach was repaired and put in a state of readiness in 1951–52. Wartime damage was repaired. The reconstructed entries took on a form that was modified from the original design, using the old foundations. By the late 1950s interest in fixed fortifications was waning after France developed a nuclear deterrent. The money needed to maintain and upgrade the fortifications was diverted for the nuclear programs. Schoenenbourg was not manned or maintained after the early 1970s The gallery system was used by the army for training until 2001, and the surface hosted three field emplacements for anti-aircraft missiles.

== Current condition ==
Cross-section of a 75 mm combat block showing the operation of the turret

In 1987 the French Army allowed the Association des Amis de la Ligne Maginot d'Alsace (Alsace Association of Friends of the Maginot Line) to conduct tours of the fortification. From 1981 the group has worked to restore Schoenenbourg. The information point for visitors is in Block 7, with self-guided tours.

The nearby Abri de Grasserloch may also be toured by prior arrangement. The Casemate d'Esch is operated by the same organisation. On 4 September 2001, Schoenenbourg was the first gros ouvrage to be sold by the Ministry of Defense to a local community.

== See also ==
- List of all works on Maginot Line
- Siegfried Line
- Atlantic Wall
- Czechoslovak border fortifications

== Bibliography ==
- Allcorn, William. The Maginot Line 1928-45. Oxford: Osprey Publishing, 2003. ISBN 1-84176-646-1
- Degon, André; Zylberyng, Didier, La Ligne Maginot: Guide des Forts à Visiter, Editions Ouest-France, 2014. ISBN 978-2-7373-6080-0 (in French)
- Kaufmann, J.E. and Kaufmann, H.W. Fortress France: The Maginot Line and French Defenses in World War II, Stackpole Books, 2006. ISBN 0-275-98345-5
- Kaufmann, J.E., Kaufmann, H.W., Jancovič-Potočnik, A. and Lang, P. The Maginot Line: History and Guide, Pen and Sword, 2011. ISBN 978-1-84884-068-3
- Mary, Jean-Yves; Hohnadel, Alain; Sicard, Jacques. Hommes et Ouvrages de la Ligne Maginot, Tome 1. Paris, Histoire & Collections, 2001. ISBN 2-908182-88-2 (in French)
- Mary, Jean-Yves; Hohnadel, Alain; Sicard, Jacques. Hommes et Ouvrages de la Ligne Maginot, Tome 2. Paris, Histoire & Collections, 2003. ISBN 2-908182-97-1 (in French)
- Mary, Jean-Yves; Hohnadel, Alain; Sicard, Jacques. Hommes et Ouvrages de la Ligne Maginot, Tome 3. Paris, Histoire & Collections, 2003. ISBN 2-913903-88-6 (in French)
- Mary, Jean-Yves; Hohnadel, Alain; Sicard, Jacques. Hommes et Ouvrages de la Ligne Maginot, Tome 5. Paris, Histoire & Collections, 2009. ISBN 978-2-35250-127-5 (in French)
