= Ouvrage Lembach =

- Part of Maginot Line
- Northeast France
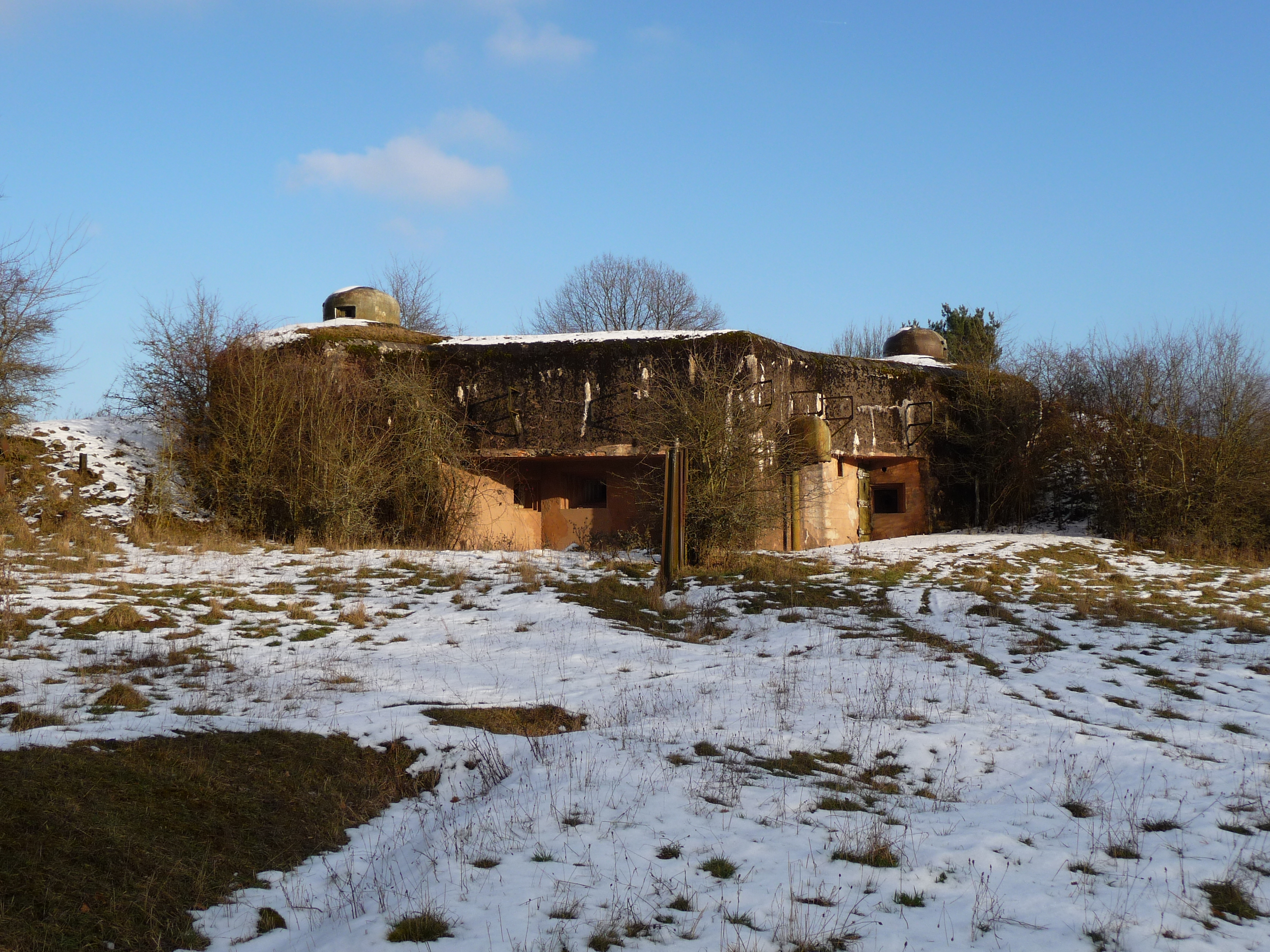
- Infantry Block 1

Site information
- Type: Petit ouvrage
- Controlled by: France
- Open to the public: No

Location
- Position within France
- Coordinates: 48.99616°N 7.77415°E

Site history
- Built by: CORF
- In use: Abandoned
- Materials: Concrete, steel, deep excavation
- Battles/wars: Battle of France, Lorraine Campaign, Battle of the Bulge

Ouvrage Lembach is a petit ouvrage of the Maginot Line. Lembach is adjoined by petit ouvrage Grand Hohekirkel at some distance to its west and gros ouvrage Four-à-Chaux immediately to its east. It faces the German frontier, and was part of the Fortified Sector of the Vosges. During the Battle of France in 1940, the German 215th Infantry Division broke through the line of smaller fortifications to the west of Lembach, but did not directly attack. After aerial bombardments, Lembach surrendered with the rest of the Maginot fortifications according to the terms of the Second Armistice at Compiègne. After the war Lembach was renovated for further use, but was abandoned by the 1970s.

== Design and construction ==
The site was surveyed by CORF (Commission d'Organisation des Régions Fortifiées), the Maginot Line's design and construction agency; Lembach was approved for construction in July 1931. The petit ouvrage (Note: English-language sources use the French term ouvrage as the preferred term for the Maginot positions, in preference to "fort", a term usually reserved for older fortifications with passive defensives in the form of walls and ditches. The literal translation of ouvrage in the sense of a fortification in English is "work." A gros ouvrage is a large fortification with a significant artillery component, while a petit ouvrage is smaller, with lighter arms.) was to be expanded in a second phase of construction, planned but not carried out, envisioned the addition of an 81mm mortar turret and new, separate munitions and personnel entries.

== Description ==
Lembach comprises an entry block, two infantry blocks and one observation block. A small entry block exists near Block 1, with underground barracks and service areas along the gallery that links the combat blocks.

- Block 1: Infantry block with two GFM cloches, one twin machine gun cloche and one machine gun (JM)/47mm anti-tank gun embrasure (JM/AC47).
- Block 2: Infantry block with two GFM cloches, one twin machine gun cloche and one machine gun (JM)/47mm anti-tank gun embrasure (JM/AC47).
- Block 3: Infantry block with one GFM cloche, two twin machine gun cloches and one observation cloche (VDP).
- Entry: Entry block with two automatic rifle embrasures.

=== Casemates and shelters ===
A series of detached casemates and infantry shelters are in the vicinity of Lembach, including

- Casemate de Lembach: Casemate in close proximity to Lembach's entrance, but not connected. Single block with one JM/AC47 embrasure, one twin machine gun embrasure and a GFM cloche.

Additionally, the space between Lembach and Grand-Hohékirkel, its neighbor to the west, is filled by more than forty casemates and blockhouses along the river Schwartzbach and across the ridge to the Sauer river.

== Manning ==
The 1940 manning of the ouvrage under the command of Captain Drouin comprised 58 men and 4 officers of the 165th Fortress Infantry Regiment. The units were under the umbrella of the 5th Army. The nearby Casernement de Lembach provided peacetime above-ground barracks and support services to Lembach and other positions in the area.

== History ==
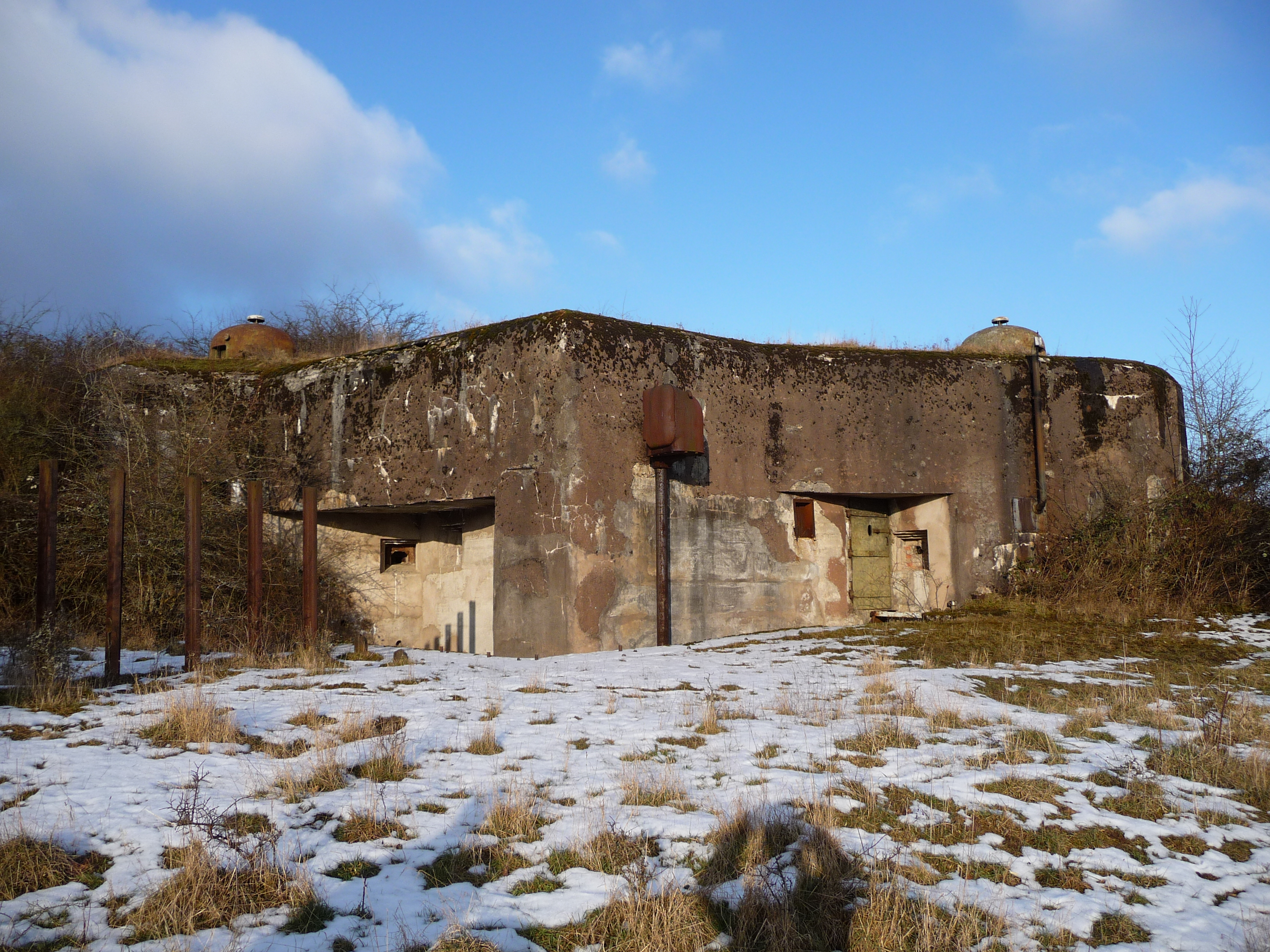
Block 2

See Fortified Sector of the Vosges for a broader discussion of the Vosges sector of the Maginot Line.

=== 1940 ===
On 19 June 1940, the German 215th Infantry Division attacked in the area immediately to the west of Lembach, between the river Schwartzbach and Lembach. Later in the day, Lembach and other ouvrages were bombed by Stukas with no significant effect. The next day an attack was repelled with artillery support from Hochwald. The German advance continued into the Vosges region, but did not directly attack Lembach. Lembach, Four-à-Chaux and Hochwald formally surrendered on 1 July 1940.

=== 1944-1945 ===
Lembach saw little action during the Lorraine Campaign, where most action took place around Hochwald and Schoenenbourg.

=== Cold War ===
In the 1950s interest in the Maginot Line was renewed. In 1951, Lembach, Four-à-Chaux, Hochwald and Schoenenbourg were designated the Môle de Haguenau, a point of resistance against a potential invasion by forces of the Warsaw Pact. Lembach was repaired and put in a state of readiness in 1951-52. By the late 1950s interest in fixed fortifications was waning after France developed a nuclear deterrent. The money needed to maintain and upgrade the fortifications was diverted for the nuclear programs. Lembach was not manned or maintained after the early 1970s

== Present condition ==
Lembach is privately owned and reported to be in poor condition.

== See also ==
- List of all works on Maginot Line
- Siegfried Line
- Atlantic Wall
- Czechoslovak border fortifications

== Bibliography ==
- Allcorn, William. The Maginot Line 1928-45. Oxford: Osprey Publishing, 2003. ISBN 1-84176-646-1
- Allcorn, William. The Maginot Line 1928-45. Oxford: Osprey Publishing, 2003. ISBN 1-84176-646-1
- Kaufmann, J.E. and Kaufmann, H.W. Fortress France: The Maginot Line and French Defenses in World War II, Stackpole Books, 2006. ISBN 0-275-98345-5
- Kaufmann, J.E., Kaufmann, H.W., Jancovič-Potočnik, A. and Lang, P. The Maginot Line: History and Guide, Pen and Sword, 2011. ISBN 978-1-84884-068-3
- Mary, Jean-Yves; Hohnadel, Alain; Sicard, Jacques. Hommes et Ouvrages de la Ligne Maginot, Tome 1. Paris, Histoire & Collections, 2001. ISBN 2-908182-88-2 (in French)
- Mary, Jean-Yves; Hohnadel, Alain; Sicard, Jacques. Hommes et Ouvrages de la Ligne Maginot, Tome 2. Paris, Histoire & Collections, 2003. ISBN 2-908182-97-1 (in French)
- Mary, Jean-Yves; Hohnadel, Alain; Sicard, Jacques. Hommes et Ouvrages de la Ligne Maginot, Tome 3. Paris, Histoire & Collections, 2003. ISBN 2-913903-88-6 (in French)
- Mary, Jean-Yves; Hohnadel, Alain; Sicard, Jacques. Hommes et Ouvrages de la Ligne Maginot, Tome 5. Paris, Histoire & Collections, 2009. ISBN 978-2-35250-127-5 (in French)
