= Ouvrage Grand-Hohékirkel =

- Part of Maginot Line
- Northeast France

Site information
- Owner: French Army
- Controlled by: France

Location
- Coordinates: 49.0525°N 7.50511°E

Site history
- Built by: CORF
- In use: Abandoned
- Materials: Concrete, steel, deep excavation
- Battles/wars: Battle of France, Lorraine Campaign, Battle of the Bulge

Ouvrage Grand-Hohékirkel is a petit ouvrage of the Maginot Line, located near Bitche in the French département of Moselle. Grand-Hohékirkel is adjoined by gros ouvrage Otterbiel to the west and petit ouvrage Lembach at some distance to the east, and faces the German frontier. It was part of the Fortified Sector of the Vosges.

Grand-Hohékirkel comprises two separate entrance blocks for ammunition and personnel, three infantry blocks, one artillery block and one observation block. Grand-Hohékirkel saw no significant action in the Battle of France, and limited action during the 1944/45 Lorraine Campaign. It was renovated for use during the Cold War. Grand-Hohékirkel is now unused, on restricted military land.

== Design and construction ==
The site was surveyed by the Commission d'Organisation des Régions Fortifiées (CORF), the Maginot Line's design and construction agency; Grand-Hohékirkel was approved for construction in August 1931. The petit ouvrage (Note: English-language sources use the French term ouvrage as the preferred term for the Maginot positions, in preference to "fort", a term usually reserved for older fortifications with passive defensives in the form of walls and ditches. The literal translation of ouvrage in the sense of a fortification in English is "work." A gros ouvrage is a large fortification with a significant artillery component, while a petit ouvrage is smaller, with lighter arms.) is a typical gros ouvrage of the smaller sort, with separate personnel and munitions entries a few hundred meters to the rear of the combat blocks, which are sited on an eminence controlling the terrain to the north. A second phase of construction, planned but not carried out, envisioned the addition of an 81mm mortar turret and an additional 75mm gun turret.

== Description ==
Grand-Hohékirkel comprises two entrance blocks, three infantry blocks, one artillery block and an observation block. The munitions and personnel entries are located to the rear of the compactly arranged combat blocks. A small barracks and usine or service area are located near the personnel entry. Grand-Hohékirkel lacks a main "M1" magazine, usually provided in a gros ouvrage. From the junction of the entry galleries a gallery runs at an average depth of 30 metres (98 ft) to the combat blocks.

- Block 1: Infantry block with one retractable twin machine gun turret and one automatic rifle cloche (GFM).
- Block 2: Infantry block with two GFM cloches, two twin machine gun cloches, one twin machine gun embrasure and one machine gun (JM)/47mm anti-tank gun embrasure (JM/AC47).
- Block 3: Infantry block with two GFM cloches, one twin machine gun cloche, one twin machine gun embrasure and one JM/AC 47 embrasure.
- Block 4: Artillery block with one GFM cloche, one observation cloche (VDP), one grenade launcher cloche (LG) and one 75mm gun embrasure.
- Block 5: Observation block with one GFM cloche and one GFM/observation cloche.
- Personnel entry: Shaft-style entry block with one GFM cloche and one JM/AC47 embrasure.
- Munitions entry: Direct entry block with two GFM cloches and one JM/AC47 embrasure.

=== Casemates and shelters ===
A series of detached casemates and infantry shelters are in the vicinity of Grand-Hohékirkel, including

- Abri du Dépôt: Subsurface abri-caverne (Note: An abri is an infantry shelter, sometimes underground or under earth cover. An abri in the main Maginot Line often closely resembles a casemate, but is more lightly armed and can hold more occupants.) with two GFM cloches
- Abri de Wolfschlachen: Subsurface abri-caverne with two GFM cloches.

Additionally, the space between Grand-Hohékirkel and Lembach, its neighbor to the east, is filled by more than forty casemates and blockhouses along the river Schwartzbach and across the ridge to the Sauer river.

== Manning ==
The 1939 manning of the ouvrage under the command of Commandant Fabre comprised 179 men and 7 officers of the 154th Fortress Infantry Regiment and the 168th Position Artillery Regiment. The units were under the umbrella of the 5th Army. The nearby Casernement de Neunhoffen provided peacetime above-ground barracks and support services to Grand-Hohékirkel and other positions in the area.

== History ==
See Fortified Sector of the Vosges for a broader discussion of the Vosges sector of the Maginot Line.

=== 1940 ===
Grand-Hohékirkel saw relatively little action in 1940 compared to its neighbors, and surrendered to the Germans with the rest of the Bitche fortifications on 30 June 1940. Its chief action was artillery support of the line of casemates to the east of Grand-Hohékirkel which were attacked by the German 215th Infantry Division on 19 June 1940, breaking the French line.

=== 1944 and 1945 ===
At the end of November 1944 the U.S. Seventh Army under General Alexander Patch had reached the Vosges region. Grand-Hohékirkel was occupied by elements of the German 25th Panzer Grenadier Division. Otterbiel and Grand-Hohékirkel were to be the next positions to be attacked by the U.S. 100th Infantry Division, but the planned operation was disrupted by the Battle of the Bulge. The Seventh Army withdrew to cover areas vacated by the U.S. Third Army, which moved to confront the German offensive.

The 100th returned in March 1945 attacked the area on a broad front. Grand-Hohékirkel was lightly defended, and the Americans, backed up by heavy artillery, were able to capture Grand-Hohékirkel and the Ensemble de Bitche with few casualties.

=== Cold War ===
Following World War II, interest revived in the use of the Maginot Line to defend against a possible Soviet advance through southern Germany. Funds were allocated for restoration of the gros ouvrages, but work was limited to restoration of systems and improvements to existing armament, with work completed by 1953. By 1953, Grand-Hohékirkel had been designated part of the Mòle de Bitche, a strongpoint in the northeastern defenses against Soviet attack. By the late 1950s interest in fixed fortifications was waning after France developed a nuclear deterrent. The money needed to maintain and upgrade the fortifications was diverted for the nuclear programs. Grand-Hohékirkel was not manned or maintained after the early 1970s.

== Present condition ==
Grand-Hohékirkel is on military land and is not accessible to the public.

== See also ==
- List of all works on Maginot Line
- Siegfried Line
- Atlantic Wall
- Czechoslovak border fortifications

== Bibliography ==
- Allcorn, William. The Maginot Line 1928-45. Oxford: Osprey Publishing, 2003. ISBN 1-84176-646-1
- Kaufmann, J.E. and Kaufmann, H.W. Fortress France: The Maginot Line and French Defenses in World War II, Stackpole Books, 2006. ISBN 0-275-98345-5
- Kaufmann, J.E., Kaufmann, H.W., Jancovič-Potočnik, A. and Lang, P. The Maginot Line: History and Guide, Pen and Sword, 2011. ISBN 978-1-84884-068-3
- Mary, Jean-Yves; Hohnadel, Alain; Sicard, Jacques. Hommes et Ouvrages de la Ligne Maginot, Tome 1. Paris, Histoire & Collections, 2001. ISBN 2-908182-88-2 (in French)
- Mary, Jean-Yves; Hohnadel, Alain; Sicard, Jacques. Hommes et Ouvrages de la Ligne Maginot, Tome 2. Paris, Histoire & Collections, 2003. ISBN 2-908182-97-1 (in French)
- Mary, Jean-Yves; Hohnadel, Alain; Sicard, Jacques. Hommes et Ouvrages de la Ligne Maginot, Tome 3. Paris, Histoire & Collections, 2003. ISBN 2-913903-88-6 (in French)
- Mary, Jean-Yves; Hohnadel, Alain; Sicard, Jacques. Hommes et Ouvrages de la Ligne Maginot, Tome 5. Paris, Histoire & Collections, 2009. ISBN 978-2-35250-127-5 (in French)
