= 215th Infantry Division (Wehrmacht) =

Military unit of the German Army

- 215. Infanterie-Division
- Division insignia
- Active: 26 August 1939 – 9 October 1944
- Country: Nazi Germany
- Branch: Army
- Type: Infantry
- Size: Division
- Engagements: World War II: Phoney War; France 1940; Occupation of France; Eastern Front; Siege of Leningrad; Leningrad–Novgorod; Baltic Offensive; Courland Pocket

The 215th Infantry Division (215.Infanterie-Division) was a major military unit of the German Army that served in World War II.

== Combat history ==
The 215th Infantry division was mobilized in September 1939 as a division of the 3rd wave in military district V. Its personnel was composed mostly of older men, many who were veterans of the First World War, and reserve troops with limited training.

The division was almost immediately sent to the west and took up defensive positions in the dank and damp bunkers of the west-wall, in winter temperature that sunk to below freezing. After some weeks it was withdrawn into training areas behind the front for further training and reorganization and many of the older troops and junior offices were replaced by younger men. By Mid March 1940 it was returned to the front in the Saar where it set about improving defensive positions under desultory French artillery fire.

The division only took part in the later stages of the invasion of France, when the campaign had essentially already been decided, attacking the Maginot Line on 19 July 1940.

=== Attack on the Maginot Line ===
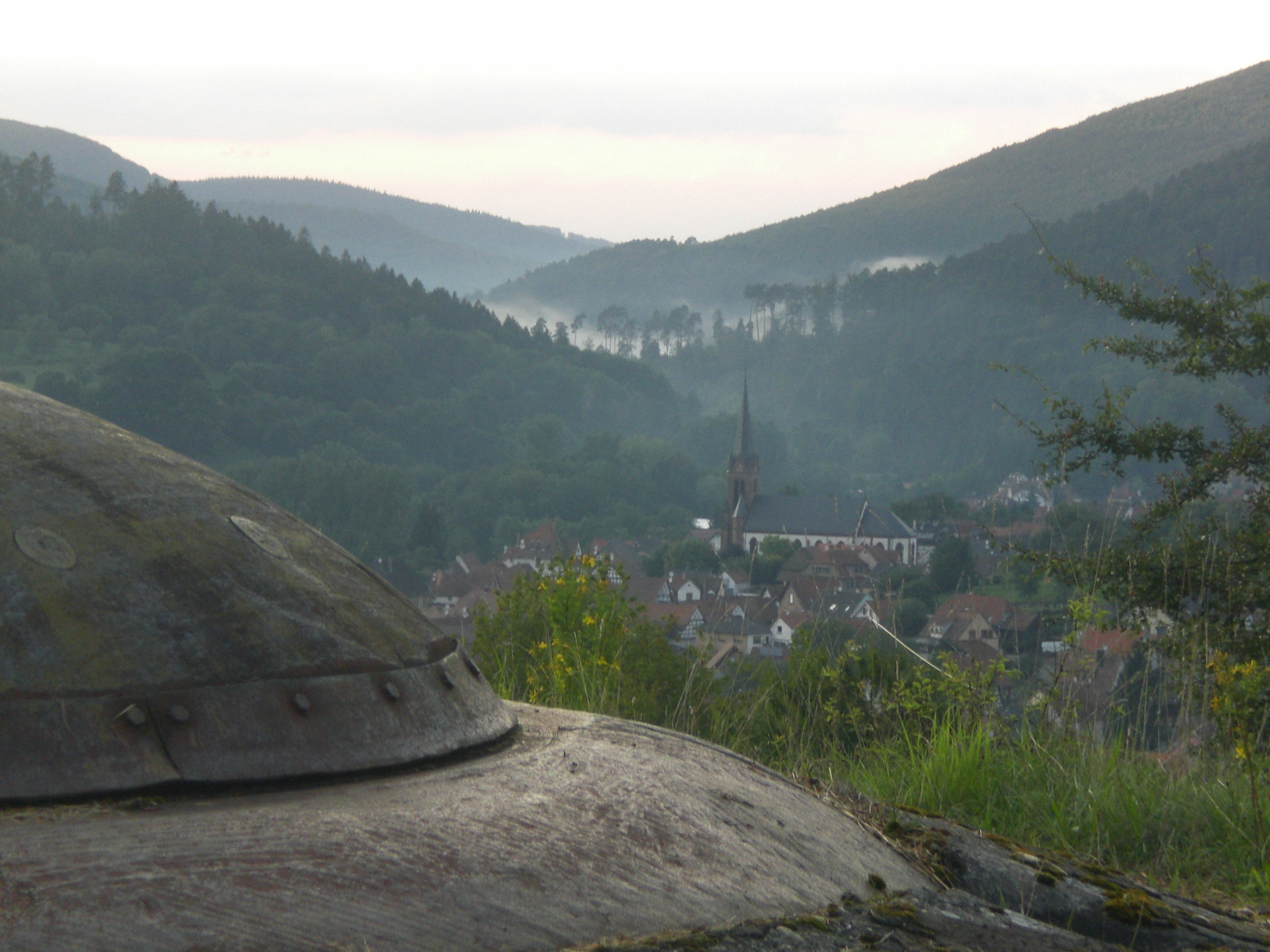
The fortress. Four-à-Chaux had fine views and fields of fire around the surrounding countryside, this view from block 5 shows the village Lembach.

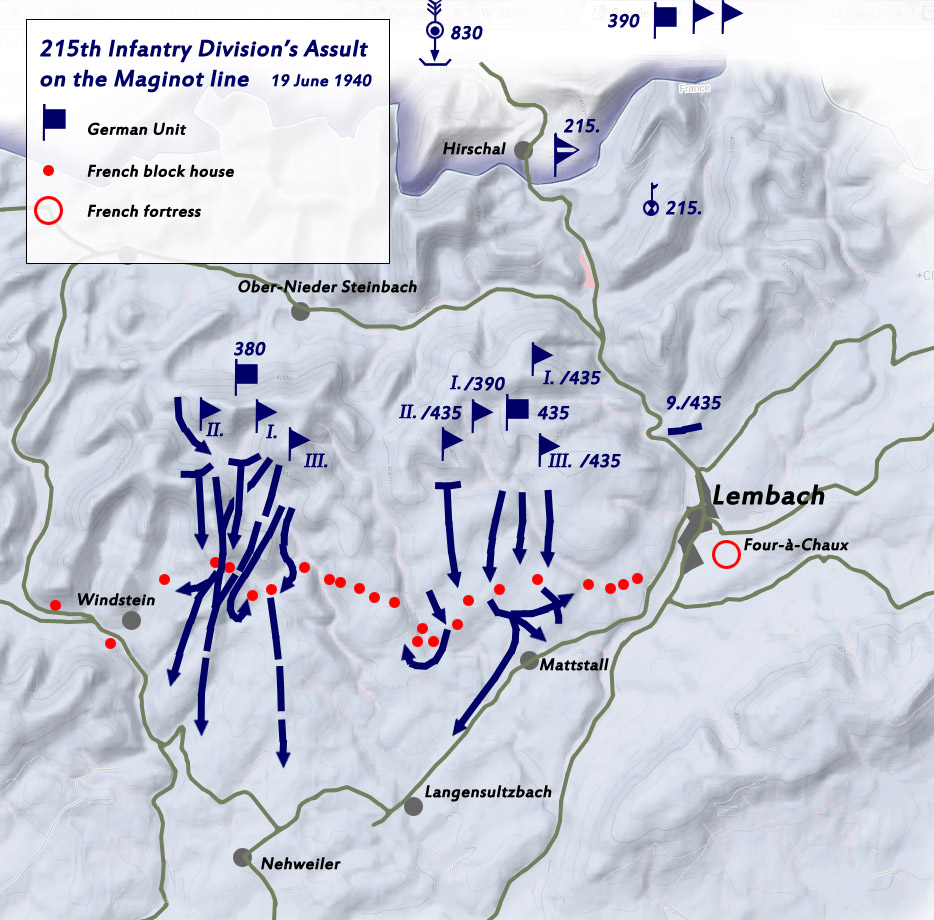
215th Infantry Division's assault on the Maginot Line, 19 June 1940

In spite of the rough terrain of the Vosges mountains its chances of successful attack were elevated by the French removal of interval troops, withdrawn to meet the German breakthroughs elsewhere. The lack of interval troops meant that the German assault teams had a much higher chance of closing on the French defenses, surrounding them and blasting them out from close range. One advantage the French defenders retained was fire from two artillery forts anchoring their line in the Vosages, the Grand-Hohékirkel and Four-à-Chaux

For the assault, the 215 division formed two battle groups based on Infantry Regiments 380 and 435, reinforced with pioneers and proceeded by a heavy 2 hour long bombardment from divisional and attached heavy artillery. Dive bomber support was also available from the Luftwaffe. In the initial attack, battle group 380 captured 2 blockhouses by clambering on their roofs and dropping explosive charges into their embrasures. Utilizing the gap in the line, further casements were outflanked and attacked from the rear, by nightfall 6 blockhouses had been captured in its sector. The fortress of Four-à-Chaux consisted of six blocks of which four had artillery pieces, its 75mm gun had the longest range and covered the blockhouses to its left. It also had shorter range 81mm and 135mm weapons. These weapons poured fire on the 435th Regiment attack, whilst the further blockhouses were covered by the more distant 75mm gun turret of the Grand Grand Hohékirkel. The Germans had found the French artillery support heavy but hampered by lack of direct observation ineffective. The assault group from the 435 Infantry Regiment had similar success, so that the division was poised to exploit the breaches the following morning.

The divisions forces moved rapidly south, capturing the Pechelbronn oilfields, its primary objective, and linking up with 257 Infantry division coming from the north west. In the two days of fighting the division had captured 1460 prisoners, but casualties included 31 dead and 108 wounded.

Following the cease fire the division became an occupation unit in central France, where it remained until November 1941, when it was hurriedly loaded onto trains for transport to the east.

=== Soviet Union ===
52nd Soviet Army began a series of attacks against the 126th Infantry positions which, under pressure from four rifle divisions, and after several days of combat, gave way allowing the Soviet to threaten the supply lines into Tichvin at Gruzino. The newly arriving units 215th infantry division was hurriedly rushed up in support took over a wide sector in freezing temperatures reaching under 30 °C, with deep snow, lying in places over a meter deep and soon became embroiled in fending off repeated Soviet attacks. By the start of December it was clear to the German leadership that the thrust at Tichvin was unsustainable and the units involved were out on a limb.

The combination of overstretched fronts, depleted units under increasing Soviet pressure, deteriorating weather conditions, and a shaky supply situation meant that the front had to be brought back. von Leeb persuaded a reluctant Hitler, and pulled the front back to the line of the Volkov, a withdrawal that was complete by 23 December. In its short commitment east of the Volkov the division had already had over 500 combat casualties, including 29 officers, and suffered an additional 603 frostbite cases.

Once back on line of the Volkov river line, the German line stabilized, but the Soviets continued their attacks into the new year.

On 13 January 1942, after a short reorganization, the Soviet Volkov front unleashed further attacks all along the line. In the sector of the 2nd Shock army, after a heavy artillery preparation, the ground assault troops struck the juncture of the 215 and 126th Infantry divisions, causing a shaky response from the former. The front had been penetrated, but so far the German major strong points were still holding out. It took another two attempts over 8 days to finally capture the villages of Spasskaia Polist, Mosti and Miasnoi Bor, and create a narrow but deep penetration of 7–8 miles, in heavy and costly fighting for both sides.

In July the division was withdrawn from the front, and after a brief rest and refit near Tosno, was given a defensive sector on the Leningrad siege lines by Staro Panowo and Urizk. Although now positioned in a quieter area the division often had to supply battle groups to other units in 'fire-brigade' actions.

Further heavy defensive fighting developed in January 1944 when the German defensive around Leningrad finally crumbled. The division retreated through Luga and finally took up positions in the Panther line, which it defended until May 1944. Following another short refit, the division was committed again to the front, and retreated with Army Group North back through Estonia, Riga into Courland where the whole army group became trapped, and supplied only via sea. After fighting in the initial Courland defensive battles, the division was relieved and shipped back to Germany, to West Prussia. The remnant of the division finally capitulated at the end of the war in the Hela Paninsula.

== Commanders ==
- Generalleutnant Baptist Knieß 1 September 1939 – 13 November 1941
- Generalleutnant Bruno Frankewitz 14 November 1941 – 5 April 1945

== Organisation ==
1939

- Infantry Regiment 380 (I, II, III)
- Infantry Regiment 390 (I, II, III)
- Infantry Regiment 435 (I, II, III)
- Reconnaissance Battalion 215
- Artillery Regiment 215 (I, II, III, IV)
- Engineer Battalion 204
- Anti-tank Battalion 215
- Signals Battalion 215
- Division services 215

=== Service and operational area ===
Date	Army Corps	Army	Army group	Area of operations
September 1939	Reserve	7th Army	C	Upper Rhine
October 1939	XXV.	7th Army	C	Upper Rhine
January 1940	XXIV.	1st Army	C	Saarpfalz
May 1940	XXXVII.	1st Army	C	Saarpfalz
July 1940	XXXXV.	1st Army	C	Vosges
August 1940	XXV.	12th Army	C	Vosges
September 1940	XVIII.	1st Army	C	Eastern France
November 1940	LX.	1st Army	D	France
December 1940	XXXXV.	1st Army	D	France
January 1941	XXXXV.	1st Army	D	France
December 1941	Reserve	16th Army	North	Tikhvin
January 1942	IXXXIX.	16th Army	North	Tikhvin
February 1942	L.	18th Army	North	Volkhov
August 1942	L.	18th Army	North	Leningrad
October 1942	L.	11th Army	North	Leningrad
November 1942	L.	18th Army	North	Leningrad
January 1943	L.	18th Army	North	Leningrad
September 1943	XXVI.	18th Army	North	Leningrad
November 1943	L.	18th Army	North	Leningrad
January 1944	L.	18th Army	North	Luga
March 1944	XXVIII.	18th Army	North	Pskov
June 1944	Reserve	18th Army	North	Pskov
July 1944	II.	16th Army	North	Daugavpils
August 1944	I.	16th Army	North	Livonia
October 1944	VI. SS	16th Army	North	Bauske
November 1944	L.	Kleffel	North	Courland
December 1944	XXXVIII.	16th Army	North	Courland
January 1945	XXXVIII.	16th Army	North	Courland
February 1945	Reserve	16th Army	Courland	Courland
March 1945	XVIII.	2nd Army	Vistula	West Prussia

== Bibliography ==
- Marc Romanych, Martin Rupp & (10 February 2010). Maginot Line 1940: Battles on the French Frontier (Campaign). Osprey Publishing. ISBN 978-1846034992.
- Glantz, David M. (30 November 2002). The Battle for Leningrad, 1941-1944. University Press of Kansas. ISBN 978-0700612086.
- Madeja, W. Victor (February 1989). Russo-German War, Autumn 1941: Defeat of Barbarossa/No 27. Game Book Marketing Co. ISBN 978-0941052825.
- Haupt, Werner (31 May 2005). Die deutschen Infanterie-Divisionen. Nebel Verlag GmbH. ISBN 978-3895552748.
- Die Geschichte der 215. Infanterie-Division. Nebel Verlag GmbH. 31 May 2005. ISBN 978-3895552700.
