= Ouvrage Four-à-Chaux =

French military museum

- Part of Maginot Line
- Northeast France
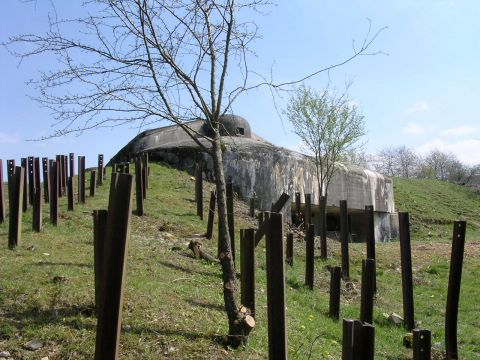
- Block 6 and the array of anti-tank rails

Site information
- Controlled by: France
- Open to the public: Yes
- Condition: Preserved

Location
- Location within France
- Coordinates: 48.99694°N 7.797°E

Site history
- Materials: Concrete, steel, deep excavation
- Battles/wars: Battle of France, Lorraine Campaign

Ouvrage Four-à-Chaux is a gros ouvrage of the Maginot Line, located in the community of Lembach, France, in the Bas-Rhin département. Four à Chaux was adjoined by petit ouvrage Lembach and gros ouvrage Hochwald, and faced the German frontier as part of the Fortified Sector of the Vosges. A "four à chaux" is a lime kiln in French, and the ouvrage was located in the area of a limestone quarry and kiln, which operated until 1939. Four-à-Chaux was bombarded by the invading Germans in late June 1940 during the Battle of France with both aerial attacks and artillery bombardments. Four-à-Chaux survived to surrender at the end of the month. Block 1 was destroyed by the Germans before retreating in the face of American advances in 1945. During the 1950s Four-à-Chaux was renovated and reoccupied against a perceived threat from the Soviet Union. It fell out of use in the 1970s, and is now operated as a museum.

== Design and construction ==
The site was surveyed by CORF (Commission d'Organisation des Régions Fortifiées), the Maginot Line's design and construction agency; Lembach was approved for construction in July 1931. The gros ouvrage (Note: English-language sources use the French term ouvrage as the preferred term for the Maginot positions, in preference to "fort", a term usually reserved for older fortifications with passive defensives in the form of walls and ditches. The literal translation of ouvrage in the sense of a fortification in English is "work." A gros ouvrage is a large fortification with a significant artillery component, while a petit ouvrage is smaller, with lighter arms.) was intended to receive a second 75mm gun turret in a second phase of construction, never pursued. Due to its compact arrangement, Four-à-Chaux did not receive an electrified internal rail system; the garrison pushed carts on the rails between the blocks. The fort also features an artesian well.

== Description ==
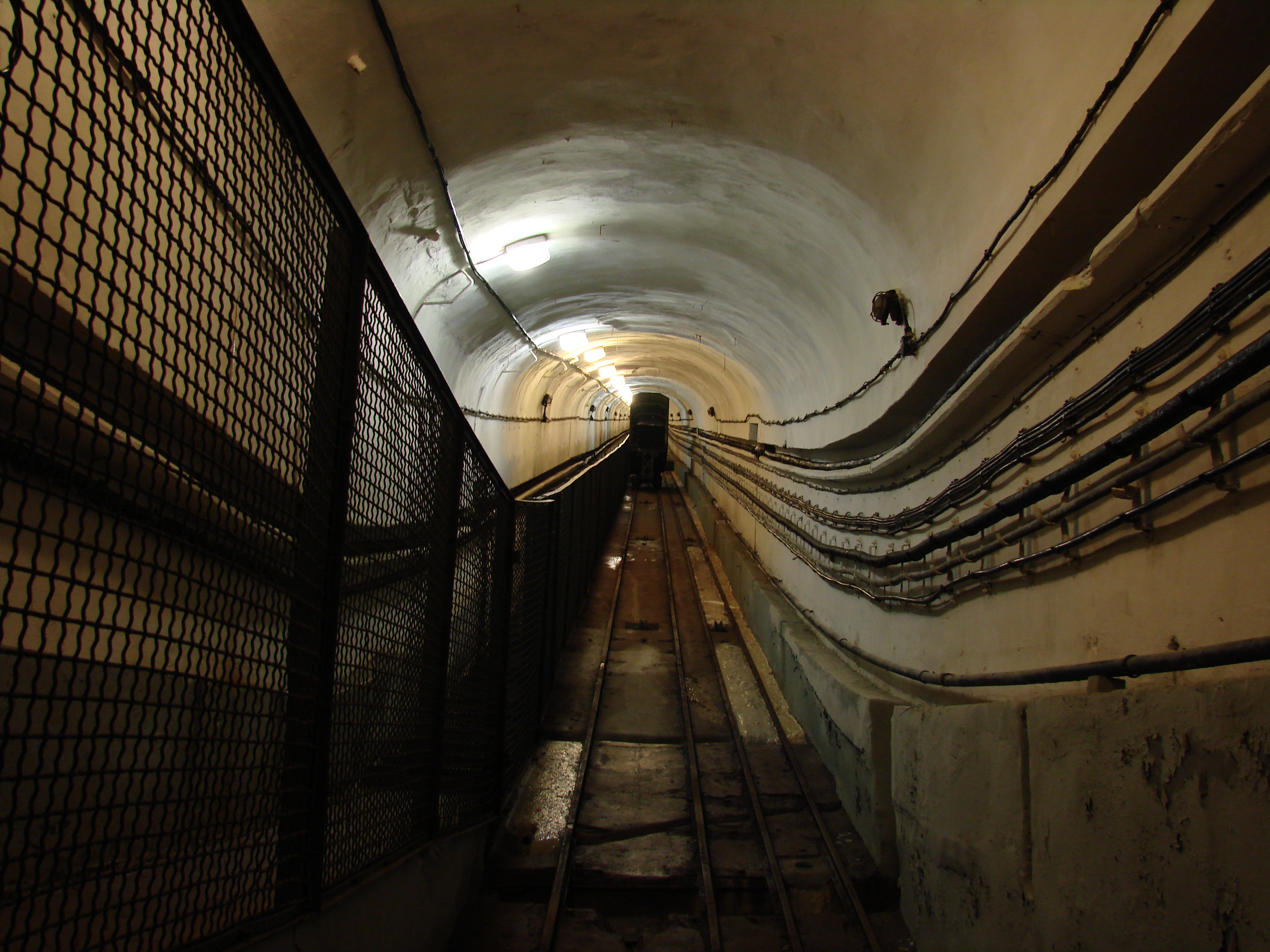
The incline of the fortress, was used to carry the ammunition and material to the upper gallery. This is an exception of the Maginot Line, as usually classical elevators were used.

Four-à-Chaux is a position of medium importance on the Line, covering an area of 26 hectares, 4.5 km of subterranean galleries and six combat blocks. The ouvrage comprises eight blocks, with six combat blocks and two entries. The significant change in level between the combat blocks and the ammunition entrance required an inclined gallery immediately after the ammunition entrance. There is a 24-meter elevation difference between the ammunition entrance and the higher personnel entrance. In contrast to most gros ouvrages in northeastern France, Four-à-Chaux's internal railway system was not electrified. A drainage gallery was built to function as an emergency exit from the area of the caserne.

- Block 1: Artillery block with two automatic rifle cloches (GFM) and one 135mm retractable twin gun turret. The interior of the block was destroyed by the Germans during explosives effects testing.
- Block 2: Artillery block with one GFM cloche, one twin machine gun cloche (JM) and one 75mm retractable twin gun turret.
- Block 3: Artillery block with one GFM cloche, one grenade launcher cloche (LG) and one 81mm retractable twin mortar turret.
- Block 4: Observation block with one GFM cloche, two JM cloches and one observation cloche (VDP).
- Block 5: Infantry block with one GFM cloche and one retractable twin machine gun turret.
- Block 6: Infantry block with one GFM cloche, one VDP cloche, one JM cloche, one twin machine gun embrasure and one machine gun (JM)/47mm anti-tank gun embrasure (JM/AC47). The block was extensively renovated in the 1950s.
- Personnel entrance: one machine gun embrasure (JM) and one GFM cloche, as well as a false GFM cloche.
- Ammunition entrance: one JM/AC 47 anti-tank gun embrasure and two GFM cloches.

=== Casemates and shelters ===
A detached casemate is nearby:

- Casemate de Schmelzbach Ouest: Single block with one JM/AC47 embrasure, one twin machine gun embrasure and a GFM cloche.

== Manning ==
The 1940 manning of the ouvrage under the command of Commandant Exbrayat comprised 491 men and 19 officers of the 165th Fortress Infantry Regiment. The units were under the umbrella of the 5th Army. The nearby Casernement de Lembach provided peacetime above-ground barracks and support services to Four-à-Chaux and other positions in the area.

== History ==
See Fortified Sector of the Vosges for a broader discussion of the Vosges sector of the Maginot Line.

=== 1940 ===
On 19 June 1940, the German 215th Infantry Division attacked in the area immediately to the west of Lembach, between the river Schwartzbach and Lembach. Later in the day, Four-à-Chaux and other ouvrages were bombed by Stukas with no significant effect. Four-à-Chaux's 135mm and 75mm gun turrets fired on the Germans throughout the day. The next day an attack was repelled with artillery support from Hochwald. Four-à-Chaux was heavily bombarded from the air and from German artillery during the period. The German advance continued into the Vosges region, but did not directly attack Four-à-Chaux with infantry. Four-à-Chaux formally surrendered on 1 July 1940.

=== 1944–1945 ===
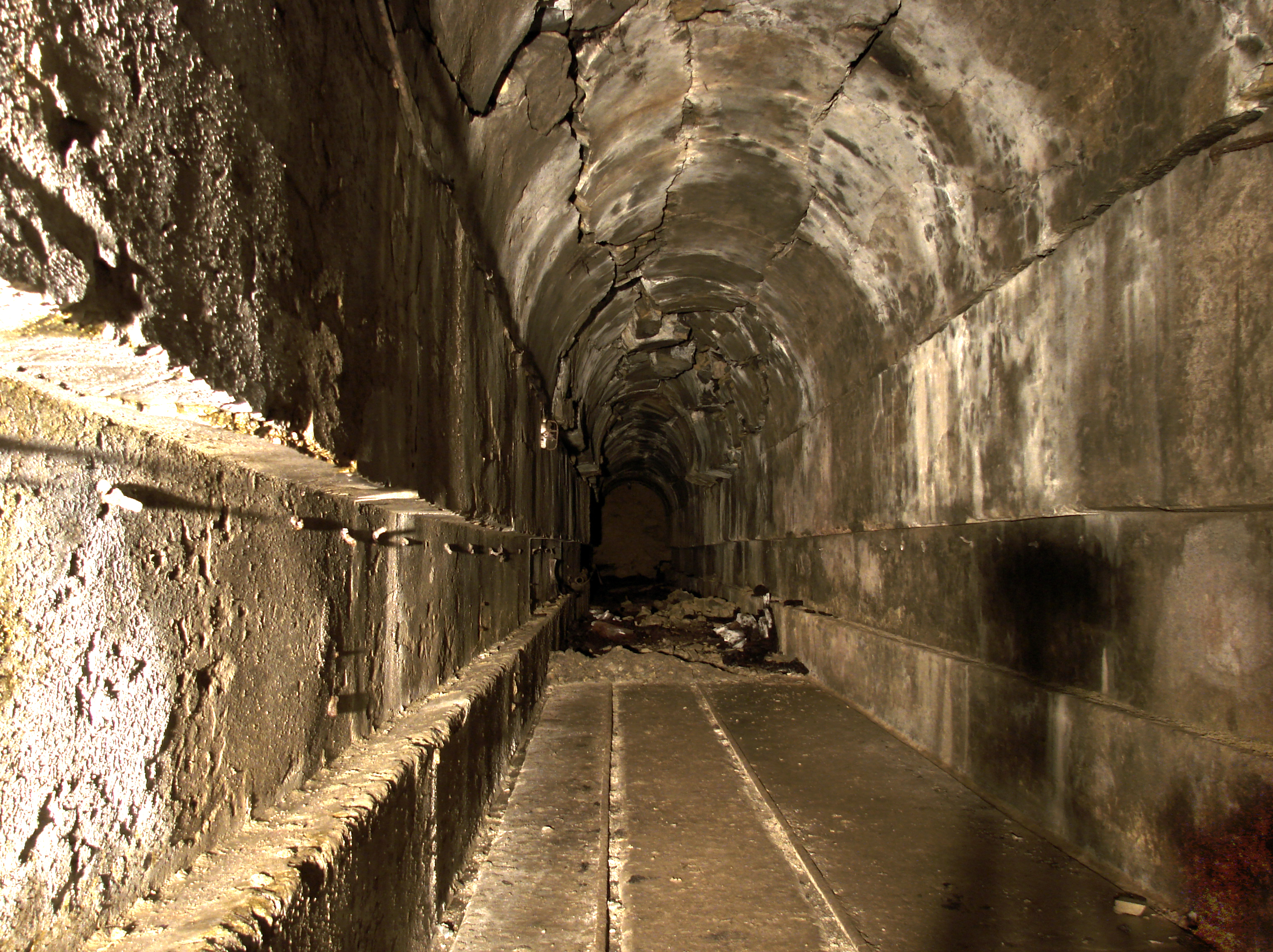
What still can be seen of Block 1 after German testings. The block never was rebuilt, in contrary to the rest of the fortress.

Four-à-Chaux saw little action during the Lorraine Campaign, where most action took place around Hochwald and Schoenenbourg. Block 1 was destroyed using explosives by the Germans before the surrender in 1945.

=== Cold War ===
In the 1950s interest in the Maginot Line was renewed. In 1951, Lembach, Four-à-Chaux, Hochwald and Schoenenbourg were designated the Môle de Haguenau, a point of resistance against a potential invasion by forces of the Warsaw Pact. Four-à-Chaux was repaired and put in a state of readiness in 1951–52, with the exception of the destroyed Block 1. By the late 1950s interest in fixed fortifications was waning after France developed a nuclear deterrent. The money needed to maintain and upgrade the fortifications was diverted for the nuclear programs. Four-à-Chaux was not manned or maintained after the early 1970s.

== Current condition ==
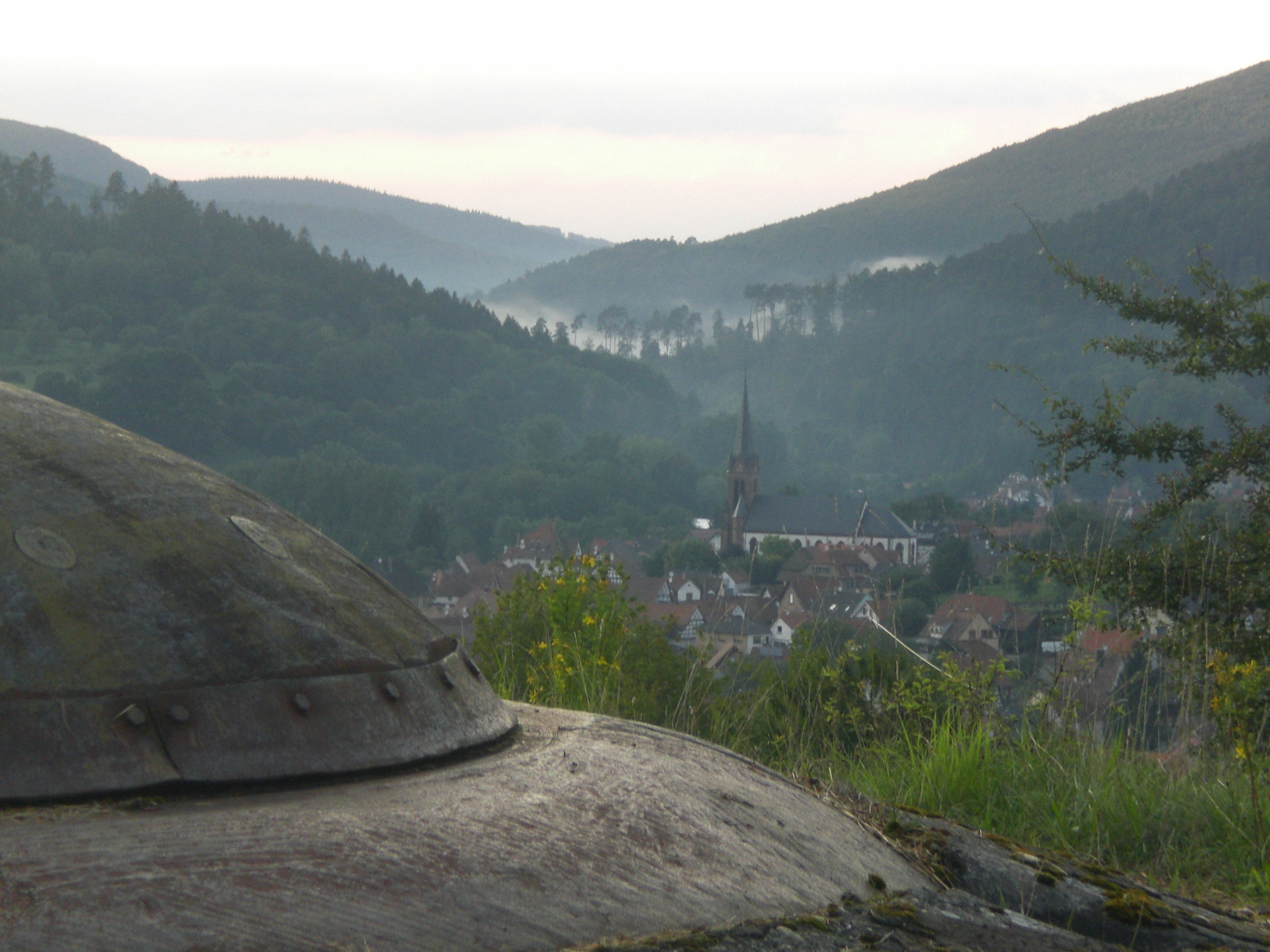
View on the village Lembach from block 5 of the fortress.

Today, Four-à-Chaux is open to the public under the guidance of the SILE (Syndicat d'Initiative de Lembach et Environs) association. The guided visit includes Block 2, the barracks, principal gallery, usine and the museum. The ouvrage may be visited throughout the year. The surface of the ouvrage is not accessible due to the presence of unexploded ordnance.

== See also ==
- List of all works on Maginot Line
- Siegfried Line
- Atlantic Wall
- Czechoslovak border fortifications

== Bibliography ==
- Allcorn, William. The Maginot Line 1928–45. Oxford: Osprey Publishing, 2003. ISBN 1-84176-646-1
- Degon, André; Zylberyng, Didier, La Ligne Maginot: Guide des Forts à Visiter, Editions Ouest-France, 2014. ISBN 978-2-7373-6080-0 (in French)
- Kaufmann, J.E. and Kaufmann, H.W. Fortress France: The Maginot Line and French Defenses in World War II, Stackpole Books, 2006. ISBN 0-275-98345-5
- Kaufmann, J.E., Kaufmann, H.W., Jancovič-Potočnik, A. and Lang, P. The Maginot Line: History and Guide, Pen and Sword, 2011. ISBN 978-1-84884-068-3
- Mary, Jean-Yves; Hohnadel, Alain; Sicard, Jacques. Hommes et Ouvrages de la Ligne Maginot, Tome 1. Paris, Histoire & Collections, 2001. ISBN 2-908182-88-2 (in French)
- Mary, Jean-Yves; Hohnadel, Alain; Sicard, Jacques. Hommes et Ouvrages de la Ligne Maginot, Tome 2. Paris, Histoire & Collections, 2003. ISBN 2-908182-97-1 (in French)
- Mary, Jean-Yves; Hohnadel, Alain; Sicard, Jacques. Hommes et Ouvrages de la Ligne Maginot, Tome 3. Paris, Histoire & Collections, 2003. ISBN 2-913903-88-6 (in French)
- Mary, Jean-Yves; Hohnadel, Alain; Sicard, Jacques. Hommes et Ouvrages de la Ligne Maginot, Tome 5. Paris, Histoire & Collections, 2009. ISBN 978-2-35250-127-5 (in French)
