= Fortified Sector of the Vosges =

The Fortified Sector of the Vosges (Secteur Fortifiée des Vosges) was the French military organization that in 1940 controlled the section of the Maginot Line at the northern end of the Vosges Mountains in northeastern France. The sector was bordered to the west by the Fortified Sector of Rohrbach and to the east by the Fortified Sector of Haguenau. The sector featured two gros ouvrages mounting heavy artillery at either end of the sector and one petit ouvrage mounting infantry weapons, linked by a line of casemates. The sector was attacked in 1940 by German forces in the Battle of France. German forces penetrated the casemate line and moved behind French lines. Despite the withdrawal of the mobile forces that supported the fixed fortifications, the three ouvrages successfully fended off German assaults before the Second Armistice at Compiègne, but were unable to hinder German activities to their south. The positions and their garrisons finally surrendered on 1 July 1940. Following the war several positions were reactivated for use during the Cold War. One position, Ouvrage Four-à-Chaux, is open to the public and may be visited.

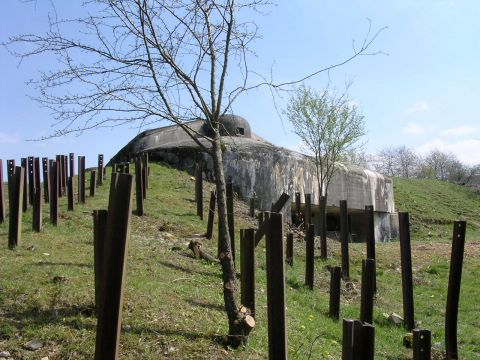
Block 6, Four-à-Chaux

== Concept and organization ==
The Vosges sector was part of the larger Fortified Region of the Lauter, a strongly defended area between the Sarre to the west and the Rhine valley to the east. The Lauter region was more important during the planning and construction phase of the Maginot Line than it was in the operational phase of the Line, when the sectors assumed prominence. The Fortified Region of the Lauter was dissolved as a military organization on 5 March 1940, becoming the 43rd Fortress Army Corps.

The sector was anchored at either end by Grand-Hohékirkel on the west and Lembach-Four-à-Chaux on the east. In between the Line was filled in with casemates and blockhouses, with the stretch from Glasbronn to Windstein located behind the Swachwartzbach stream. This central portion of the depended on topography for much of its defense. The central casemate line was supported by the guns of the ouvrages and by the late addition of the casemates of Biesenberg and Windstein, which provided lateral covering fire with 75mm guns. Three proposed petit ouvrages were never constructed.

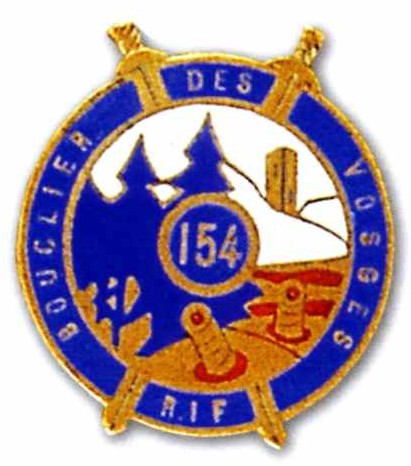
Insignia of the 154th RIF.

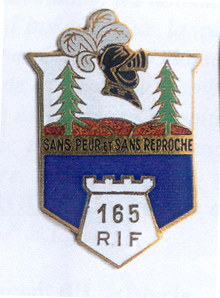
Insignia of the 165th RIF.

== Command ==
The Vosges sector was under the overall command of the French 5th Army, headquartered at Wangenbourg, under the command of General Bourret, which was in turn part of Army Group 2 under General André-Gaston Prételat. The SF Vosges was commanded by General Viellard, then Colonel André. The command post was at Baerenthal, then Ingwiller. The interval troops, the army formations that were to provide the mobile defense for the sector, to support and be supported by the fixed defenses, were from the 30th Alpine Infantry Division. Artillery support for the sector was provided by the 168th Position Artillery Regiment (Régiment d'Artillerie de Position (RAP)), which controlled both fixed and mobile artillery, commanded by Lieutenant Colonel Robo. The 30th DIA was a Class A reserve formation.

On 5 March 1940 the SF Vosges was reorganized and designated the 43rd Army Fortress Corps (43e Corps d'Armée de Forteresse), inheriting some elements from the RF Lauter and giving up the 37th RIF to SF Rohrbach. At the midpoint of the Battle of France on 1 June 1940, the fortress troops of the 43rd CAF amounted to two fortress infantry regiments in six battalions, comprising 525 officers and 15,250 men. By 13 June the 43rd CAF included the hastily assembled divisions de marche Senselme and Chestenet, previously the fortress units of the SF Vosges and SF Rohrbach, as well as the 30th DIA.

== Description ==
The sector includes, in order from west to east, the following major fortified positions, together with the most significant casemates and infantry shelters in each sub-sector: (Note: English-language sources use the French term ouvrage as the preferred term for the Maginot positions, in preference to "fort", a term usually reserved for older fortifications with passive defenses in the form of walls and ditches. The literal translation of ouvrage in the sense of a fortification in English is "work." A gros ouvrage is a large fortification with a significant artillery component, while a petit ouvrage is smaller, with lighter arms.)

=== Sub-sector of Philippsbourg ===
154th Fortress Infantry Regiment (154^{e} Régiment d'Infanterie de Forteresse (RIF)), Lt. Colonel Lambert

- Ouvrage Grand-Hohékirkel (Ouvrage C), gros ouvrage O450 of five combat blocks
- Ouvrage Main-du-Prince, proposed petit ouvrage, never constructed
- Ouvrage Grafenweiher, proposed petit ouvrage, never constructed
- Ouvrage Wineckerthal, proposed petit ouvrage, never constructed
- Abri de la Dépôt
- Abri de Wolfschachen

==== 2e UEC ====
UEC = Unité d'Équipage de Casemates), or "casemate unit"

- Casemate du Main-du-Prince Ouest
- Casemate du Main-du-Prince Ouest
- Casemate de Biesenberg (MOM/RFL)
- Blockhaus de Biesenberg I
- Blockhaus de Biesenberg II
- Blockhaus de Biesenberg III
- Blockhaus de Biesenberg IV
- Casemate de Biesenberg (CORF)
- Blockhaus de Biesenberg V
- Blockhaus de Biesenberg VI
- Blockhaus de Biesenberg VII
- Casemate de Glasbronn

==== 3e UEC ====
- Casemate d'Altzinsel
- Casemate de Rothenburg
- Casemate de Nonnenkopf
- Casemate de Grafenweiher Nord-Ouest
- Casemate de Grafenweiher Centre

==== 4e UEC ====
- Casemate de Grafenweiher Est
- Casemate de Dambach Nord (Neuhoffen)
- Casemate de Dambach Sud
- Casemate de Wineckerthal Ouest

Two avant-postes were located at Erlenmüss and Neuweiher

=== Sub-sector of Langensoultzbach ===
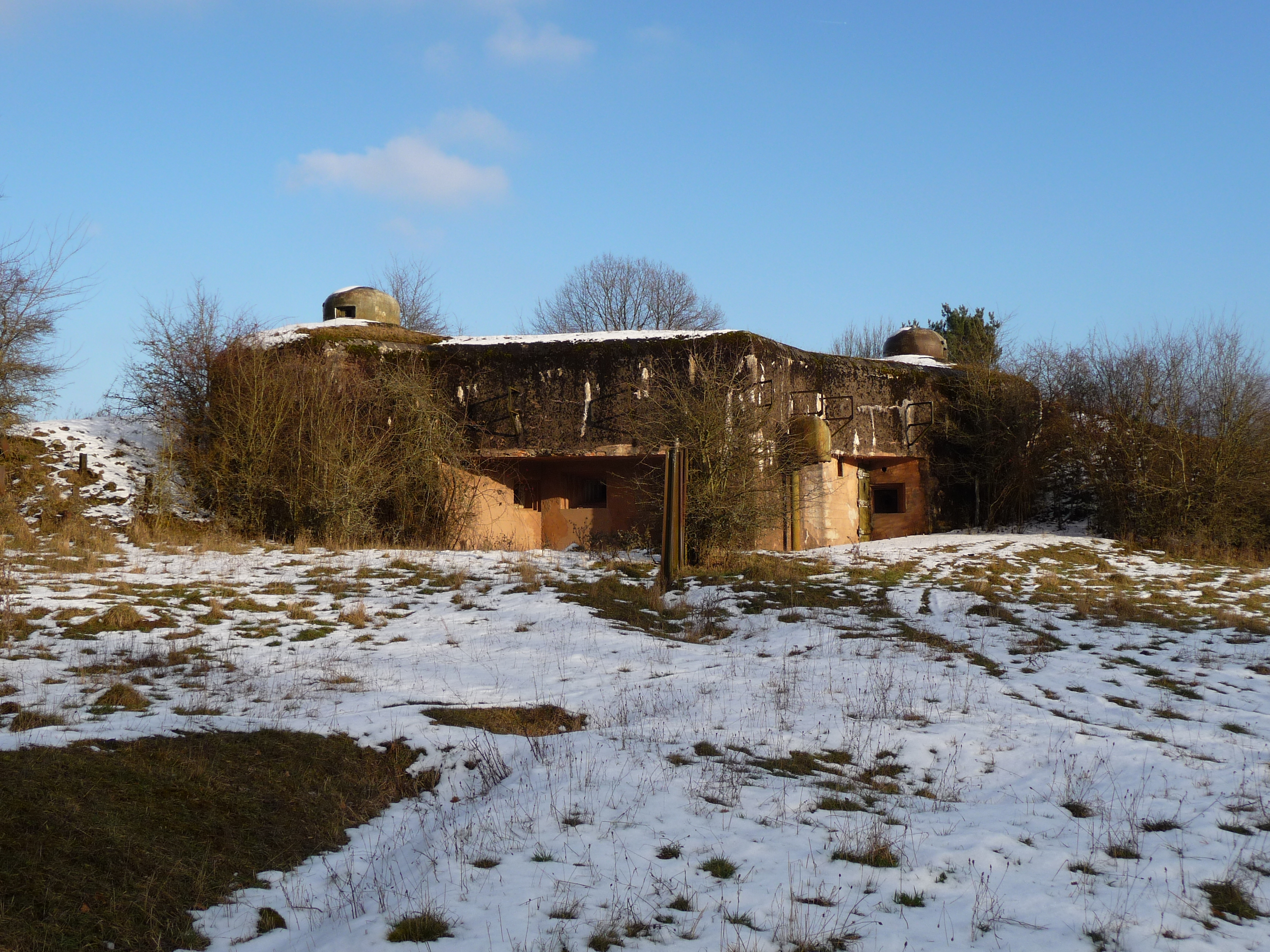
Block 1, Lembach

165th Fortress Infantry Regiment (165^{e} Régiment d'Infanterie de Forteresse (RIF)), Commandant Renard, command post at Hill 1360.

- Ouvrage Lembach (Ouvrage D), petit ouvrage O550 of three combat blocks and an entry block
- Ouvrage Four-à-Chaux (Ouvrage E), gros ouvrage O600 of nine combat blocks and two entry blocks

==== 5e CEC ====
CEC = Compangnie d'Équipage de Casemates), or "casemate company"

- Casemate de Wineckerthal Est
- Casemate de Grünenthal
- Casemate de Windstein
- Blockhaus de Nagesthal
- Blockhaus du Col-de-Gunsthal Ouest
- Blockhaus du Col-de-Gunsthal Est

==== 6e CEC ====
- Blockhaus du Ferme Gunsthal Ouest
- Blockhaus du Ferme Gunsthal Est
- Blockhaus de Saegemühle
- Blockhaus de Nonnerhardt 1
- Blockhaus de Nonnerhardt 2
- Blockhaus de Nonnerhardt 3
- Blockhaus de Nonnerhardt 4
- Blockhaus de Nonnerhardt 5
- Blockhaus de Trautbach Ouest
- Blockhaus de Trautbach Centre
- Blockhaus de Trautbach Est
- Casemate de la Verrerie
- Blockhaus de la Clairière
- Blockhaus de la Verrerie
- Blockhaus de Marbach
- Casemate de Lembach
- Casemate de Schmelzbach Ouest

There were also three avant-postes: Tannerbrück, Wingen and Langthal.

Peacetime barracks and support:

- Casernement de Langensoultzbach
- Casernement de Lembach - Four-à-Chaux

== History ==
=== Battle of France ===
In early June in the face of the German assault, all fortress units attached to the Fifth Army were ordered to prepare for withdrawal to the south and west. While fortress units under the 2nd, 3rd and 8th Armies received categorical instructions to prepare to sabotage their positions and conduct an orderly retreat from 14 to 17 June, Fifth Army commander General Bourret's instructions to the SFs Rohrbach, Vosges, Haguenau and Lower Rhine were not as definitive. The personnel of the 43rd CAF (formerly SF Vosges) were to be consolidated into a Division de Marche entitled the DM Senselme, consisting of the 154e and 165e RIFs, along with the 143 CIF (company), the V/400e RP (régiment de position) and the 59e RARF (régiment d'artillerie le la région fortifié). A partial withdrawal of fortress troops took place in the SF Vosges, with some battalions of each fortress infantry regiment remaining in their positions until the armistice to cover the withdrawal of the interval troops and the fortress infantry assigned to the divisions de marche.

On 19 June 1940, the German 215th Infantry Division attacked in the area immediately to the west of Lembach, between the river Schwartzbach and Lembach. The German objective was to break the blockhouse line between Lembach and Grand-Hohékirkel. An infantry assault on the line captured several positions. Fire support from the ouvrages was hampered by bombing attacks and a lack of observing positions . Lembach and Four-à-Chaux were bombed by Stukas with no significant effect on their defenses. Four-à-Chaux's 135mm and 75mm gun turrets fired on the Germans throughout the day. However, by the end of the day the Germans had captured twenty-two casemates and blockhouses, granting the 215th ID freedom to move behind the Maginot Line and to bypass the heavier fortifications. It moved on to the vicinity of Haguenau and secured the Pechelbronn oilfield.

The next day an attack on the ouvrages was repelled with artillery support from Hochwald. The German advance continued into the Vosges and Alsace, but did not directly attack the ouvrages. Lembach, Four-à-Chaux and Hochwald formally surrendered on 1 July 1940.

==== Units ====
The 154th RIF was stationed in the Philippsbourg sub-sector. The regiment absorbed the 21st battalion of the 37th RIF on 16 March 1940. From 7 May, the 154th RIF took fire from German positions. On 12 June, the advanced posts near the border were abandoned. Some elements of the 154th RIF withdrew to Biberkirch and La Valette. The units were finally captured near the Col du Donon on 23 and 24 June, while the units that remained in their casemates surrendered on 30 June.

The 165th RIF was deployed in the sub-sector of Langensoultzbach. On 14 June the regiment detached machine gun battalions to the DM Senselme to defend the Marne–Rhine Canal in the area of Arzviller, but fell back to Dabo and were finally captured near Mont Donon on 25 June.The fortress troops who remained in their positions surrendered on 1 July.

=== 1944 and 1945 ===
At the end of November 1944 the U.S. Seventh Army under General Alexander Patch had reached the Vosges region. Grand-Hohékirkel was occupied by elements of the German 25th Panzer Grenadier Division. Otterbiel and Grand-Hohékirkel were to be the next positions to be attacked by the U.S. 100th Infantry Division, but the planned operation was disrupted by the Battle of the Bulge. The Seventh Army withdrew to cover areas vacated by the U.S. Third Army, which moved to confront the German offensive.

The 100th returned in March 1945 attacked the area on a broad front. Grand-Hohékirkel was lightly defended, and the Americans, backed up by heavy artillery, were able to capture Grand-Hohékirkel and the Ensemble de Bitche with few casualties. Four-à-Chaux saw little action during the Lorraine Campaign, where most action took place around Hochwald and Schoenenbourg. Block 1 was destroyed using explosives by the Germans before the surrender in 1945.

=== Môle de Bitche ===
Following World War II, the French military reclaimed the Maginot Line with the aim of renovating and improving it against a possible attack by Warsaw Pact forces. Four-à-Chaux and Lembach were grouped with Hochwald and Schoenenbourg from the SF Haguenau. They were designated the môle de Bitche ("breakwater") in 1951 and were placed back into service after a period of rehabilitation. Schiesseck, Otterbiel (in the SF Rohrbach) and Grand-Hohékirkel, located at the Camp de Bitche army training center, were used for training in fortress systems and weapons. During Exercise Turenne at Grand-Hohékirkel in 1953, firing exercises cast doubt on the combat viability of the exposed cloches, which had proved vulnerable to German fire in the war. A follow-up exercise (Hoche) did, however, confirm that casemate positions remained secure against 90mm-equivalent gunfire, using AMX-13 and M47 Patton tanks to fire on embrasures.

After the establishment of the French nuclear strike force, the importance of the Line declined, and maintenance ceased in the 1970s, with most of the casemates were sold.

== Present status ==
Four-à-Chaux is open to the public under the guidance of the SILE (Syndicat d'Initiative de Lembach et Environs) association. Lembach is privately owned and reported to be in poor condition. Grand-Hohékirkel is on military land and is not accessible to the public. The casemates of Dambach Nord and Dambach Sud are open for visitation, along with a trail system through the Schwartzbach valley.

== Bibliography ==
- Allcorn, William. The Maginot Line 1928-45. Oxford: Osprey Publishing, 2003. ISBN 1-84176-646-1
- Degon, André; Zylberyng, Didier, La Ligne Maginot: Guide des Forts à Visiter, Editions Ouest-France, 2014. ISBN 978-2-7373-6080-0 (in French)
- Kaufmann, J.E. and Kaufmann, H.W. Fortress France: The Maginot Line and French Defenses in World War II, Stackpole Books, 2006. ISBN 0-275-98345-5
- Kaufmann, J.E., Kaufmann, H.W., Jancovič-Potočnik, A. and Lang, P. The Maginot Line: History and Guide, Pen and Sword, 2011. ISBN 978-1-84884-068-3
- Mary, Jean-Yves; Hohnadel, Alain; Sicard, Jacques. Hommes et Ouvrages de la Ligne Maginot, Tome 1. Paris, Histoire & Collections, 2001. ISBN 2-908182-88-2 (in French)
- Mary, Jean-Yves; Hohnadel, Alain; Sicard, Jacques. Hommes et Ouvrages de la Ligne Maginot, Tome 3. Paris, Histoire & Collections, 2003. ISBN 2-913903-88-6 (in French)
- Mary, Jean-Yves; Hohnadel, Alain; Sicard, Jacques. Hommes et Ouvrages de la Ligne Maginot, Tome 5. Paris, Histoire & Collections, 2009. ISBN 978-2-35250-127-5 (in French)
- Romanych, Marc; Rupp, Martin. Maginot Line 1940: Battles on the French Frontier. Oxford: Osprey Publishing, 2010. ISBN 1-84176-646-1
