= Maginot Line =

Line of fortifications along the French/German border

- ligne Maginot
- Eastern France
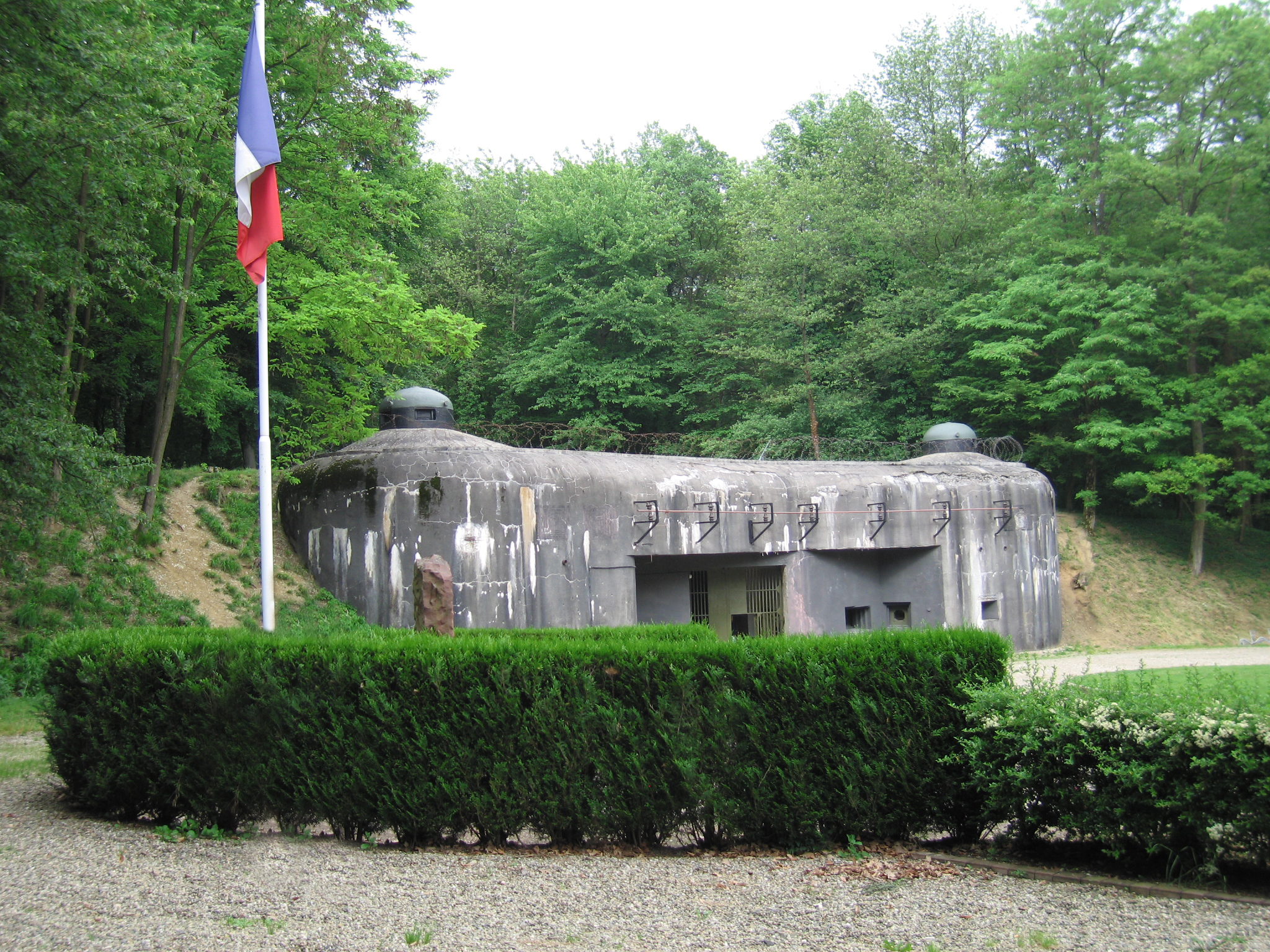
- Entrance to Ouvrage Schoenenbourg, Maginot Line in Alsace

Site information
- Type: Defensive line
- Controlled by: French Army
- Open to the public: Some sites
- Condition: Mostly intact

Location
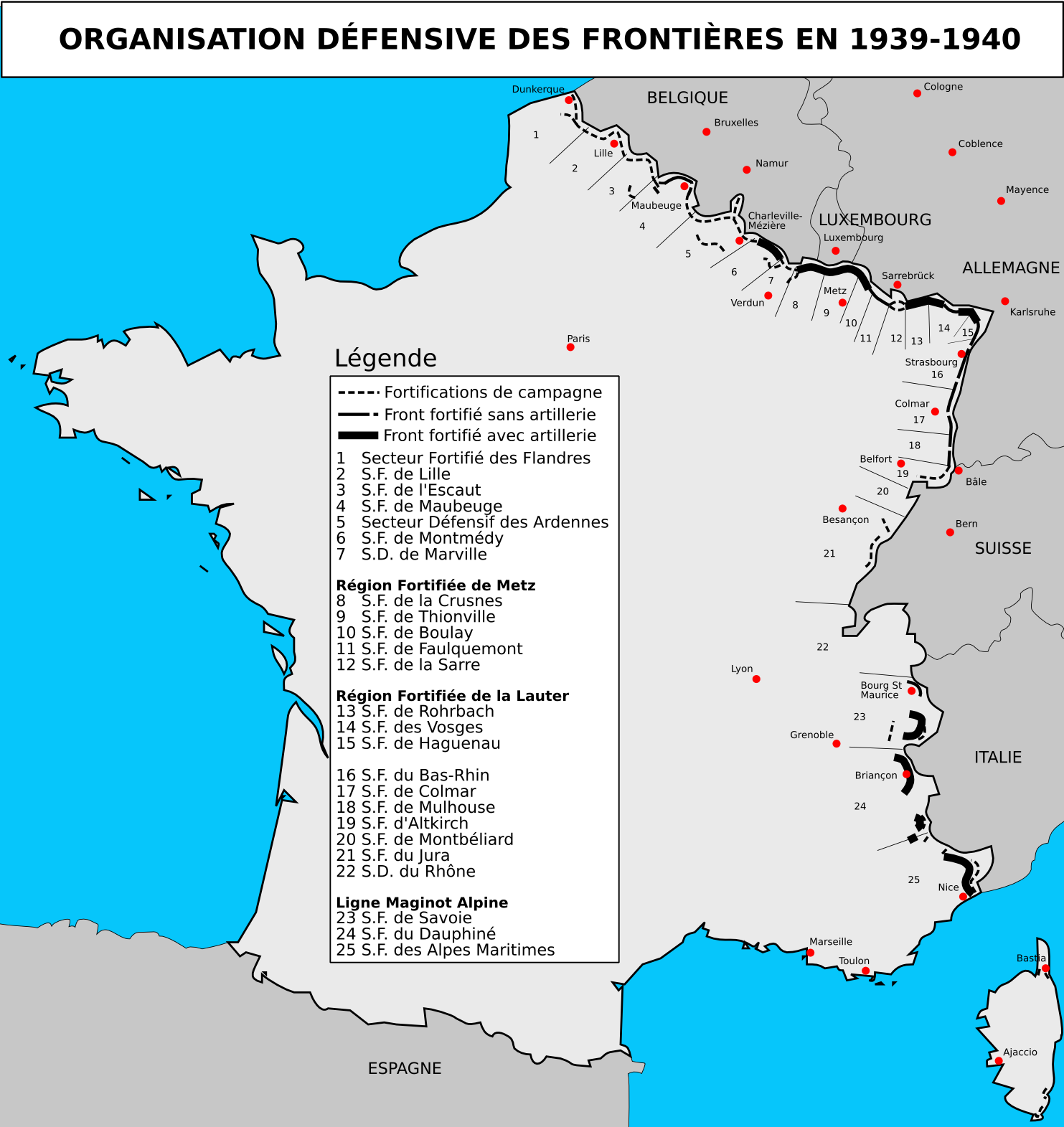

Site history
- Built: 1929–1938
- Built by: Paul Painlevé, Colonel Tricaud: Named after André Maginot (French Minister of War, late 1920s – early '30s)
- In use: 1935–1969
- Materials: Concrete, steel, iron
- Battles/wars: World War II: Battle of France (1940); Operation Nordwind (1945)

The Maginot Line (English: /ˈmæʒɪnoʊ/; French: ligne Maginot [liɲ maʒino]) (Note: German: Maginot Linie, [ˈmɑɡiːˌnoːt ˈliːnɪə].) is a line of concrete fortifications, obstacles and weapon installations built by France in the 1930s.

Named after the French Minister of War André Maginot, it was constructed on the French side of its borders with Italy, Switzerland, Germany, Luxembourg and Belgium. The line was to deter invasion by Nazi Germany and force them to move around the fortifications through Belgium. It was impervious to most forms of attack, but in 1940 the Germans invaded through the Belgian Ardennes, immediately to the north, just beyond the end of the main line of fortifications.

Based on France's experience with trench warfare during World War I, the massive Maginot Line was built before the Second World War, after the Locarno Conference in 1925 gave rise to a fanciful and optimistic "Locarno spirit". French military experts believed the line would deter German aggression because it would slow an invasion force long enough for French forces to mobilise and counter-attack.

The line was supposed to be extended along the French frontier with Belgium, but was not built in response to demands from Belgium. Belgium feared it would be sacrificed in the event of another German invasion. The French planned to advance heavily into Belgium in response to a German invasion of Belgium, meeting German forces on Belgian territory, but in the event, the Ardennes invasion allowed the Germans to outflank the French forces that advanced into Belgium.

The Maginot Line was invulnerable to aerial bombings and tank fire and used underground railways for movement. It had modern living conditions for the garrison, with air conditioning and eating areas for their comfort. French and British officers had anticipated the geographical limits of the Maginot Line; when Germany invaded the Netherlands and Belgium, they carried out the Dyle plan to form a front along the Dyle in Belgium to connect with the Maginot Line.

The French line was weak near the Ardennes. General Maurice Gamelin, when drafting the Dyle Plan, believed this region, with its rough terrain, would be an unlikely invasion route by German forces; if it were traversed, it would be done at a slow rate that would allow the French time to bring up reserves and counter-attack. The German Army, having altered their plans when it became known to the Allies in the Mechelen incident on 10 January 1940, redirected the effort against this weak point in the French defensive front. The Manstein plan replaced the original plan with a gamble that the main German armoured force could cross the Ardennes and cross the Meuse before the Allies could react. The Germans crossed the Meuse and raced down the Somme river valley, encircled much of the Allied forces in the north, leading to the Dunkirk evacuation and leaving the troops to the south unable to mount an effective resistance to the Germans.

The Maginot Line has since become a metaphor for expensive efforts that offer a false sense of security.

== Purposes ==
The Maginot Line was built to fulfill several purposes:

- To prevent a German surprise attack.
- To deter a cross-border assault.
- To protect Alsace and Lorraine (returned to France in 1918) and their industrial basin.
- To save manpower (France counted 39 million inhabitants, Germany 70 million).
- To slow an attack to permit the mobilisation of the French Army (which took between two and three weeks).
- To push Germany into an effort to circumvent via Switzerland or Belgium, and allow France to fight the next war off French soil to avoid a repeat of 1914–1918.
- To be used as a basis for a counter-offensive.

== Personnel ==
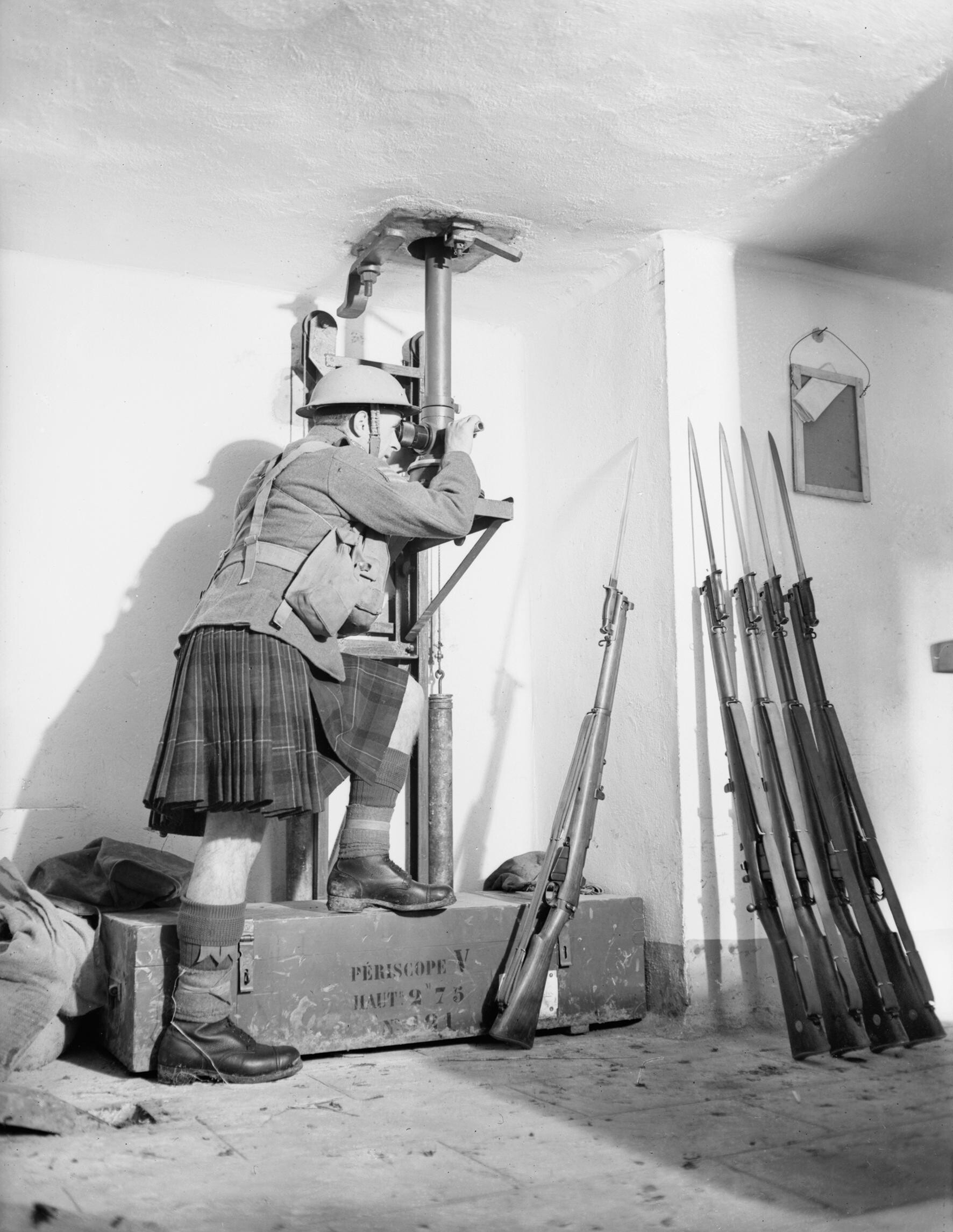
A soldier from the Cameron Highlanders looks through a periscope in the Fort de Sainghain on the Maginot Line, 3 November 1939.

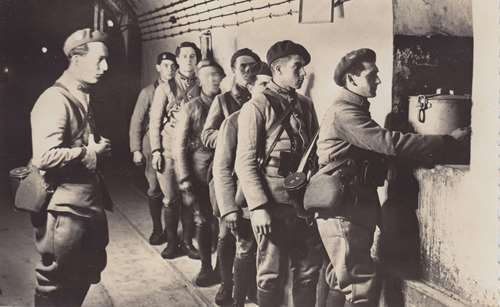
Food distribution to French troops in Maginot line. 1939.

Maginot Line fortifications were manned by specialist units of fortress infantry, artillery and engineers. The infantry manned the lighter weapons of the fortresses and formed units with the mission of operating outside if necessary. Artillery troops operated the heavy guns, and the engineers were responsible for maintaining and operating other specialist equipment, including all communications systems. All these troops wore distinctive uniform insignia and considered themselves among the elite of the French Army. During peacetime, fortresses were only partly manned by full-time troops. They would be supplemented by reservists who lived in the local area and who could be quickly mobilised in an emergency.

Full-time Maginot Line troops were accommodated in barracks built close to the fortresses. They were also accommodated in complexes of wooden housing adjacent to each fortress, which were more comfortable than living inside, but were not expected to survive wartime bombardment. The training was carried out at a fortress near the town of Bitche in Moselle in Lorraine, built in a military training area and so capable of live fire exercises. This was impossible elsewhere as the other parts of the line were located in civilian areas.

== Organization ==
Side view diagram of the operation of a retractable turret: 75 mm gun of block 3 in Ouvrage Schoenenbourg

Casemate of Dambach Nord, Fortified Sector of the Vosges, Subsector of Philippsbourg

Although the name "Maginot Line" suggests a relatively thin linear fortification, it was 20–25 kilometres (12–16 miles) deep from the German border to the rear area. It was composed of an intricate system of strong points, fortifications and military facilities such as border guard posts, communications centres, infantry shelters, barricades, artillery, machine-gun and anti-tank-gun emplacements, supply depots, infrastructure facilities and observation posts. These various structures reinforced a principal line of resistance made up of the most heavily armed ouvrages, which can be roughly translated as fortresses or big defensive works.

=== Border post line ===
This consisted of blockhouses and strong-houses, which were often camouflaged as residential homes, built within a few metres of the border and manned by troops to give the alarm in the event of a surprise attack and to delay enemy tanks with prepared explosives and barricades.

=== Outpost and support point line ===
Approximately 5 km (3 mi) behind the border there was a line of anti-tank blockhouses that were intended to provide resistance to armoured assault, sufficient to delay the enemy and allow time for the crews of the C.O.R.F. ouvrages to be ready at their battle stations. These outposts covered the main passages within the principal line.

=== Principal line of resistance ===
This line began 10 km (6 mi) behind the border. It was preceded by anti-tank obstacles made of metal rails planted vertically in six rows, with heights varying from 0.70–1.40 metres (2 ft 4 in – 4 ft 7 in) and buried to a depth of 2 m (6 ft 7 in). These anti-tank obstacles extended from end to end in front of the main works, over hundreds of kilometres, interrupted only by extremely dense forests, rivers, or other nearly impassable terrains.

The anti-tank obstacle system was followed by an anti-personnel obstacle system made primarily of dense barbed wire. Anti-tank road barriers also made it possible to block roads at necessary points of passage through the tank obstacles.

=== Infantry casemates ===
These bunkers were armed with twin machine-guns (abbreviated as JM — Jumelage de mitrailleuses — in French) and anti-tank guns of 37 or 47 mm (1.5 or 1.9 in). They could be single (with a firing room in one direction) or double (two firing rooms in opposite directions). These generally had two floors, with a firing level and a support/infrastructure level that provided the troops with rest and services (power-generating units, reserves of water, fuel, food, ventilation equipment, etc.). The infantry casemates often had one or two "cloches" or turrets located on top of them. These GFM cloches were sometimes used to emplace machine guns or observation periscopes. 20 to 30 men manned them.

=== Petits ouvrages ===
These small fortresses reinforced the line of infantry bunkers. The petits ouvrages were generally made up of several infantry bunkers, connected by a tunnel network with attached underground facilities, such as barracks, electric generators, ventilation systems, mess halls, infirmaries and supply caches. Their crew consisted of between 100 and 200 men.

=== Gros ouvrages ===
Blockhaus MOM (Main d'Oeuvre Militaire) de Richtolsheim – Secteur Fortifié de Colmar – Sous secteur de Hilsenheim

These fortresses were the most important fortifications on the Maginot Line, having the sturdiest construction and the heaviest artillery. These were composed of at least six "forward bunker systems" or "combat blocks" and two entrances and were connected via a network of tunnels that often had narrow gauge electric railways for transport between bunker systems. The blocks contained infrastructure such as power stations, independent ventilating systems, barracks and mess halls, kitchens, water storage and distribution systems, hoists, ammunition stores, workshops and spare parts and food stores. Their crews ranged from 500 to more than 1,000 men.

=== Observation posts ===
These were located on hills that provided a good view of the surrounding area. Their purpose was to locate the enemy, direct and correct the indirect fire of artillery, and report on the progress and position of critical enemy units. These are large reinforced buried concrete bunkers, equipped with armoured turrets containing high-precision optics, connected with the other fortifications by field telephone and wireless transmitters (known in French by the acronym T.S.F., Télégraphie Sans Fil).

=== Telephones ===
This system connected every fortification in the Maginot Line, including bunkers, infantry and artillery fortresses, observation posts and shelters. Two telephone wires were placed parallel to the line of fortifications, providing redundancy in case a wire was cut. There were places along the cable where dismounted soldiers could connect to the network.

=== Infantry reserve shelters ===
These were found from 500–1,000 m (1,600–3,300 ft) behind the principal line of resistance. These were buried concrete bunkers designed to house and shelter up to a company of infantry (200 to 250 men). They had amenities such as electric generators, ventilation systems, water supplies, kitchens and heating, which allowed their occupants to hold out in the event of an attack. They could also be used as a local headquarters and counterattack base.

=== Flood zones ===
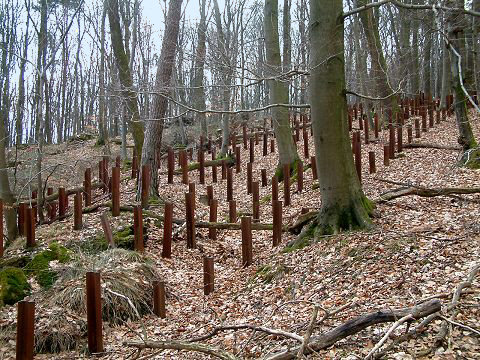
Anti-tank rails around casemate 9 of the Hochwald ditch

Flood zones were natural basins or rivers that could be flooded on demand and thus constitute an additional obstacle in the event of an enemy offensive.

=== Safety quarters ===
These were built near the major fortifications so fortress (ouvrage) crews could reach their battle stations in the shortest possible time in the event of a surprise attack during peacetime.

=== Supply depot and Ammunition dumps ===
Supply depot and ammunition dumps were built around 50 km (30 mi) away from the Maginot Line. Supplies were transported to the Maginot Line by a railway system.

=== Narrow-gauge railway system ===
A network of 600 mm (1 ft 11 5/8 in) narrow-gauge railways was built to rearm and resupply the main fortresses (ouvrages) from supply depots up to 50 km (31 mi) away. Petrol-engine armoured locomotives pulled supply trains along these narrow-gauge lines. (A similar system was developed with armoured steam engines in 1914–1918.)

=== High-voltage transmission lines ===
Initially above-ground but then buried, and connected to the civil power grid, these provided electric power to the many fortifications and fortresses.

=== Heavy rail artillery ===
This was hauled by locomotives to planned locations to support the emplaced artillery in the fortresses, which was intentionally limited in range to 10–12 km (6–7 mi).

== Inventory ==
=== Ouvrages ===
There are 142 ouvrages, 352 casemates, 78 shelters, 17 observatories and around 5,000 blockhouses in the Maginot Line. (Note: There are 58 ouvrages, 311 casemates, 78 shelters, 14 observatories and around 4,000 blockhouses on the North-West, and 84 ouvrages, 41 casemates, three observatories and around 1,000 blockhouses to the South-West.)

=== Armoured cloches ===
There are several kinds of armoured cloches. Cloches are non-retractable turrets. The word cloche is a French term meaning bell due to its shape. All cloches were made of alloy steel.

- The most widespread are the GFM cloches, where GFM means Guetteur fusil-mitrailleur (machine-gun sentry). They are composed of three to four openings, called crenels or embrasures. These crenels may be equipped as follows: light machine-guns, direct vision blocks, binoculars blocks or 50 mm (2.0 in) mortars. Sometimes, the cloche is topped by a periscope. There are 1,118 GFM cloches on the line. Almost every block, casemate and shelter is topped by one or two GFM cloches.
- The JM cloches (jumelage de mitrailleuses or "twin machine guns") are the same as the GFM cloches except that they have one opening equipped with a pair of machine guns. There are 174 JM cloches on the line.
- There are 72 AM cloches (armes mixtes or "mixed weapons") on the line, equipped with a pair of machine guns and a 25 mm (1.0 in) anti-tank gun. Some GFM cloches were transformed into AM cloches in 1934. (The aforementioned total does not include these modified cloches.)
- There are 75 LG cloches (lance-grenade or "grenade launcher") on the line. Those cloches are almost completely covered by concrete, with only a small hole to launch grenades through for local defence.
- There are 20 VP cloches (vision périscopique or "periscopic vision") on the line. These cloches could be equipped with several different periscopes. Like the LG cloches, they were almost entirely covered by concrete.
- The VDP cloches (vision directe et périscopique or "direct and periscopic vision") are similar to the VP cloches but have two or three openings to provide a direct view. Consequently, they were not covered by concrete.
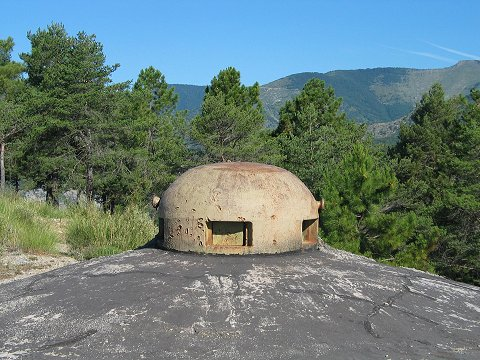
GFM cloche

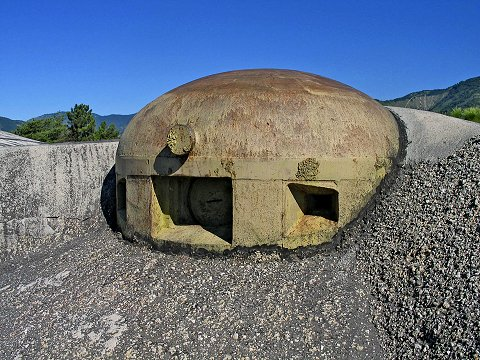
JM cloche

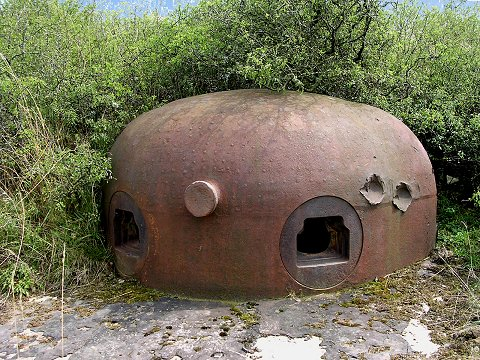
AM cloche

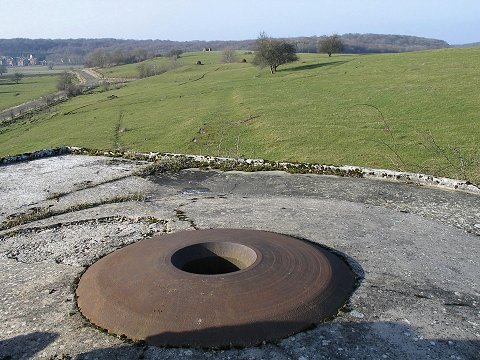
LG cloche

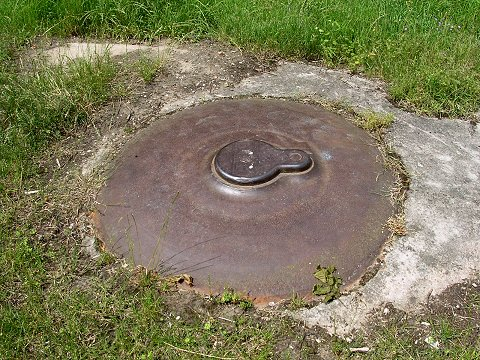
VP cloche

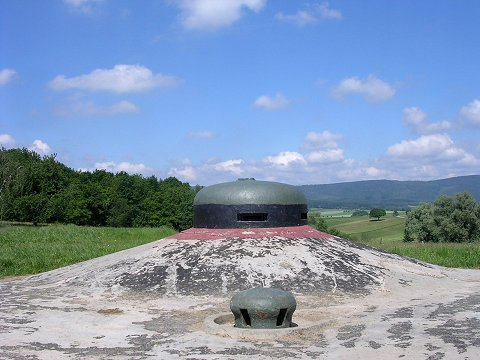
VDP cloche

=== Retractable turrets ===
The line included the following retractable turrets.

- 21 turrets of 75 mm (3.0 in) model 1933
- 12 turrets of 75 mm (3.0 in) model 1932
- 1 turret of 75 mm (3.0 in) model 1905
- 17 turrets of 135 mm (5.3 in)
- 21 turrets of 81 mm (3.2 in)
- 12 turrets for mixed weapons (AM)
- 7 turrets for mixed weapons + mortar of 50 mm (2.0 in)
- 61 turrets of machine-guns
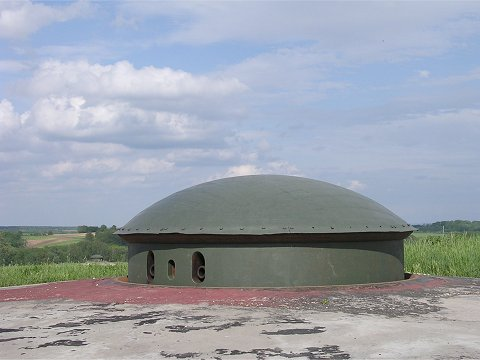
75 mm (3.0 in) Turret model 1932

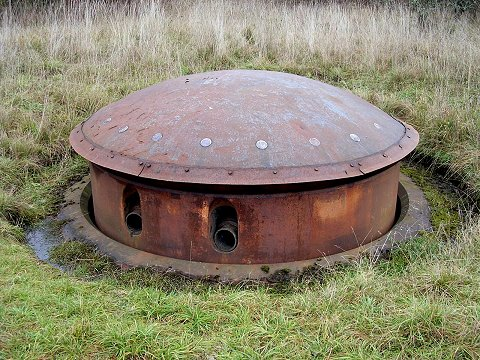
135 mm (5.3 in) Turret

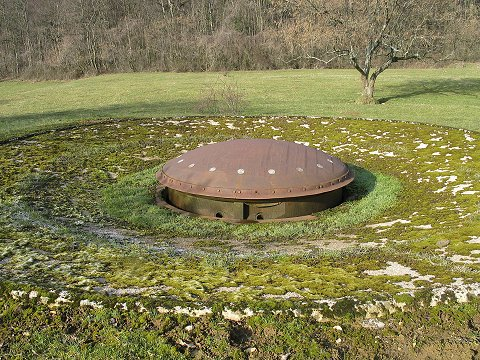
81 mm (3.2 in) Turret

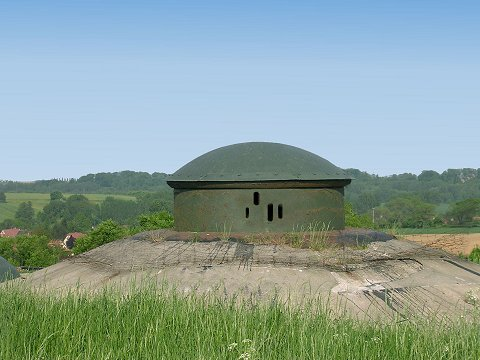
Machine-gun Turret

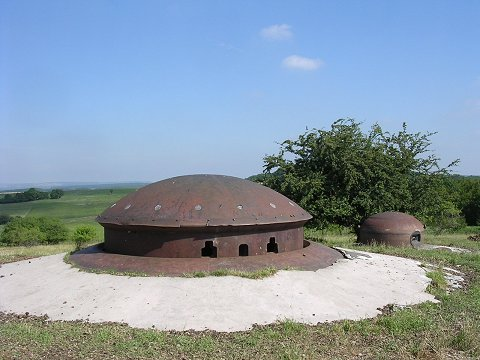
AM (Mixed-Weapons) Turret

=== Artillery ===
Both static and mobile artillery units were assigned to defend the Maginot Line. Régiments d'artillerie de position (RAP) consisted of static artillery units. Régiments d'artillerie mobile de forteresse (RAMF) consisted of mobile artillery.

=== Anti-tank guns ===
- Canon de 25 mm SA Mle1934
- SA-L Mle1937 (Puteaux) L/72
- AC 37
- AC 47

== History ==
=== Prelude ===
In January 1923, after Weimar Germany defaulted on reparations, the French Premier, Raymond Poincaré, sent French troops to occupy the Ruhr. During the Ruhrkampf (Ruhr struggle) between the Germans and the French that lasted until September 1923, Britain condemned the Occupation of the Ruhr. A period of sustained Francophobia broke out in Britain, with Poincaré being vilified in Britain as a bully, punishing Germany with unreasonable reparations demands. The British—who openly championed the German position on reparations—applied intense economic pressure on France to change its policies towards Germany. At a conference in London in 1924 to settle the Franco-German crisis caused by the Ruhrkampf, the British Prime Minister, Ramsay MacDonald, persuaded the French Premier, Édouard Herriot, to make concessions to Germany. The British diplomat, Sir Eric Phipps, who attended the conference, commented afterwards that

The London Conference was for the French 'man in the street' one long Calvary as he saw M. Herriot abandoning one by one the cherished possessions of French preponderance on the Reparations Commission, the right of sanctions in the event of German default, the economic occupation of the Ruhr, the French–Belgian railway Régie and finally, the military occupation of the Ruhr within a year.

The great conclusion that was drawn in Paris after the Ruhrkampf and the 1924 London Conference was that France could not make unilateral military moves to uphold Versailles as British hostility to such moves was too dangerous to the republic. Beyond that, the French were well aware of the contribution of Britain and its dominions to the victory of 1918. French leaders believed they needed Britain's help to win another war; the French must appease the British. From 1871, French elites had concluded that France had no hope of defeating Germany on its own, and France would need an alliance with another great power to prevail.

=== Allied Control Commission ===
In 1926, The Manchester Guardian ran an exposé showing the Reichswehr had been developing military technology forbidden by the Treaty of Versailles in the Soviet Union. The secret German–Soviet cooperation started in 1921. The German statement following The Manchester Guardian's article that Germany did not feel bound by the terms of Versailles and would violate them as much as possible gave much offence in France. In 1927, the Inter-Allied Commission, which was responsible for ensuring that Germany complied with Part V of the Treaty of Versailles, was abolished as a goodwill gesture, reflecting the "Spirit of Locarno". When the Control Commission was dissolved, the commissioners in their final report issued a condemnation, that Germany had never sought to abide by Part V and the Reichswehr had been engaging in covert rearmament all through the 1920s. Under the Treaty of Versailles, France was to occupy the Rhineland region of Germany until 1935. Still, the last French troops left the Rhineland in June 1930 in exchange for Germany accepting the Young Plan. As long as the French occupied the Rhineland, it served as a type of collateral under which the French would annexe the Rhineland in the event of Germany breaching any of the articles of the treaty, such as rearmament; this threat was powerful enough to deter German governments all through the 1920s from attempting any overt violation of Part V. French plans as developed by Marshal Ferdinand Foch in 1919 were based on the assumption that in the event of a war with the Reich, the French forces in the Rhineland were to embark upon an offensive to seize the Ruhr. A variant of the Foch plan had been used by Poincaré in 1923 when he ordered the French occupation of the Ruhr.

=== French planning ===
French plans for an offensive in the 1920s were realistic, as Versailles had forbidden German conscription, and the Reichswehr was limited to 100,000 men. Once the French forces left the Rhineland in 1930, this form of leverage with the Rhineland as collateral was no longer available to Paris, which from then on had to depend on Berlin's word that it would continue to abide by the terms of the Versailles and Locarno treaties, which stated that the Rhineland was to stay demilitarised forever. Given that Germany had engaged in covert rearmament with the co-operation of the Soviet Union starting in 1921 (a fact that had become public knowledge in 1926) and that every German government had gone out of its way to insist on the moral invalidity of Versailles, claiming it was based upon the so-called Kriegsschuldlüge (war guilt lie) that Germany started the war in 1914, the French had little faith that the Germans would willingly allow the Rhineland's demilitarised status to continue forever, and believed that at some time in the future, Germany would rearm in violation of Versailles, reintroduce conscription and remilitarise the Rhineland. The decision to build the Maginot Line in 1929 was a tacit French admission that without the Rhineland as collateral, Germany was soon going to rearm and that the terms of Part V had a limited lifespan.

=== German economy ===
After 1918, the German economy was twice as large as that of France; Germany had a population of 70 million compared to France's 40 million, and the French economy was hobbled by the need to reconstruct the enormous damage of World War I, while German territory had seen little fighting. French military chiefs were dubious about their ability to win another war against Germany without allies, especially an offensive war. French leaders knew that the victory of 1918 had been achieved because Russia, the British Empire and the United States were allies in the war and that the French would have been defeated on their own. With the United States isolationist and Britain stoutly refusing to make the "continental commitment" to defend France on the same scale as in World War I, the prospects of Anglo-American assistance in another war with Germany appeared to be doubtful at best. Versailles did not call for military sanctions in the event of the German military reoccupying the Rhineland or breaking Part V, while Locarno committed Britain and Italy to come to French aid in the event of a "flagrant violation" of the Rhineland's demilitarised status, it did not define what a "flagrant violation" would be. The British and Italian governments refused in diplomatic talks to define "flagrant violation", which led the French to place little hope in Anglo–Italian help if German military forces should reoccupy the Rhineland. Given the diplomatic situation in the late 1920s, the Quai d'Orsay (Ministry of Foreign Affairs) informed the government that French military planning should be based on a worst-case scenario that France would fight the next war against Germany without the help of Britain or the United States.

France had an alliance with Belgium and with the states of the Cordon sanitaire, as the French alliance system in Eastern Europe was known. Although the alliances with Belgium, Poland, Czechoslovakia, Romania and Yugoslavia were appreciated in Paris, it was widely understood that this was no compensation for the absence of Britain and the United States. The French military was especially insistent that the population disparity made an offensive war of manoeuvre and swift advances suicidal, as there would always be far more German divisions; a defensive strategy was needed to counter Germany. The French assumption was always that Germany would not go to war without conscription, which would allow the German Army to take advantage of the Reich's numerical superiority. Without the natural defensive barrier provided by the Rhine River, French generals argued that France needed a new defensive barrier made of concrete and steel to replace it. The power of properly dug-in defensive trenches had been amply demonstrated during World War I, when a few soldiers manning a single machine gun post could kill hundreds of the enemy in the open and therefore building a massive defensive line with subterranean concrete shelters was the most rational use of French manpower.

The American historian, William Keylor, wrote that in the diplomatic conditions of 1929 and likely trends – with the United States isolationist and Britain unwilling to make the "continental commitment" – the decision to build the Maginot Line was not irrational and stupid but a sensible response to the problems that would be created by the coming French withdrawal from the Rhineland in 1930. Part of the rationale for the Maginot Line stemmed from the severe French losses during the First World War and their effect on the French population. The drop in the birth rate during and after the war, resulting in a national shortage of young men, created an "echo" effect on the generation that provided the French conscript army in the mid-1930s. Faced with a manpower shortage, French planners had to rely more on older and less fit reservists, who would take longer to mobilise and would diminish French industry because they would leave their jobs. Static defensive positions were therefore intended to delay a German invasion and to economise on men by defending an area with fewer and less mobile forces. In 1940, France deployed about twice as many men, 36 divisions (roughly one third of its force), for the defence of the Maginot Line in Alsace and Lorraine. In contrast, the opposing German Army Group C only contained 19 divisions, fewer than a seventh of the force committed in the Manstein Plan for the invasion of France. Reflecting memories of World War I, the French General Staff had developed the concept of la puissance du feu ("the power of fire"), the power of artillery dug in and sheltered by concrete and steel, to inflict devastating losses on an attacking force.

=== Long war strategy ===
French planning for war with Germany was always based on the assumption that the war would be la guerre de longue durée, a long attritional war, in which the superior economic resources of the Allies would gradually grind the Germans down. The fact that the Wehrmacht embraced the strategy of Bewegungskrieg (war of manoeuvre) with the vision of swift wars in which Germany would win quickly via a knockout blow was a testament to the fundamental soundness of the concept of la guerre de longue durée. Germany had the largest economy in Europe but lacked many of the raw materials necessary for a modern industrial economy, making the Reich vulnerable to blockade and the ability to feed its population. The guerre de longue durée strategy called for the French to halt the expected German offensive, denying the Germans a swift victory; afterwards, there would be an attrition struggle; once the Germans were exhausted, France would begin an offensive to win the war.

The Maginot Line was intended to block the main German blow if it should come via eastern France and divert it through Belgium, where French forces would meet and stop the Germans. The Germans were expected to fight costly offensives, whose failures would sap the strength of the Reich, while the French waged a total war, mobilising the resources of France, its empire and allies. Besides the demographic reasons, a defensive strategy served the needs of French diplomacy towards Great Britain. The French imported a third of their coal from Britain and 32 per cent of all imports through French ports were carried by British ships. Of French trade, 35 per cent was with the British Empire and the majority of the tin, rubber, jute, wool and manganese used by France came from the British Empire.

About 55 per cent of overseas imports arrived in France via the Channel ports of Calais, Le Havre, Cherbourg, Boulogne, Dieppe, Saint-Malo and Dunkirk. Germany had to import most of its iron, rubber, oil, bauxite, copper and nickel, making naval blockade a devastating weapon against the German economy. For economic reasons, the success of the strategy of la guerre de longue durée would at the very least require Britain to maintain a benevolent neutrality, preferably to enter the war as an ally as British sea power could protect French imports while depriving Germany of hers. A defensive strategy based on the Maginot Line was an excellent way of demonstrating to Britain that France was not an aggressive power and would only go to war in the event of German aggression, a situation that would make it more likely that Britain would enter the war on France's side.

=== The Maginot Line ===
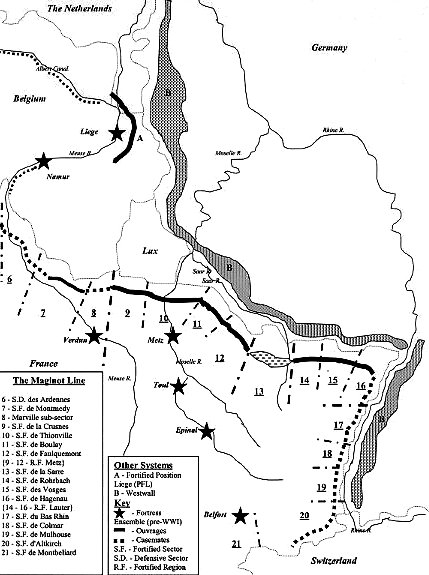
Map of the principal fortified section of the Maginot Line

Studies made by the General Staff in 1919 were reported to the Conseil supérieur de la guerre (CSG, Supreme War Council) in 1920 and a commission of 1922, chaired by Marshal Joseph Joffre reported in December 1925, in favour of centres of resistance built in peacetime, not a continuous fortified front. From 17 December 1926 to 12 October 1927, the Frontier Defence Commission reported to the CSG that fortifications should be built from Metz to Thionville and Longwy, to protect the Moselle Valley and the mineral resources and industry of Lorraine. The area around the Lauter, the most north-eastern part of the common border with Germany, should be fortified as an obvious invasion route but there was no need to fortify the Rhine, because of the Vosges mountains further west and the small number of railways on the German side. Belfort was near the Swiss frontier and partly protected by the Rhine but there was an avenue of invasion to the west, which should be protected. The commission gave emphasis to defence against a surprise attack, with the limited objective of capturing the Metz and Lauter areas.

The commission recommended that priority be given to protecting the resources and industries of Lorraine that were vital for the French economy and would become more important for a war economy. The nature of fixed defences was debated during the 1920s, with advocates of the offensive use of fortifications, deep or shallow defences and centralised and decentralised designs. On 12 October 1927, the CSG adopted the system recommended by Pétain, of large and elaborately fortified defences from Metz to Thionville and Longwy, at Lauter and Belfort, on the north-east frontier, with covered infantry positions between the main fortifications. André Maginot, the Minister of War (1922–1924, 1929–1930 and 1931–1932) became the driving force for obtaining the money to fortify the north-eastern frontier, sufficient to resist a German invasion for three weeks, to give time for the French army to mobilise. Work began in 1929 on the Région Fortifiée de Metz (Metz Fortified Region) through the Moselle valley to the Nied at Teting-sur-Nied, then the Région Fortifiée de Lauter, east of Hagenau from Bitche to the Rhine, the extension of the Metz region to Longuyon and the Lauter river region from Bitche to the Sarre (Saar) at Wittring.

Requirements for the fortifications were natural cover, sites nearby for observation posts, the minimum of dead ground, a maximum arc of fire, ground suitable for anti-tank obstacles and infantry positions and ground on which paved roads could be built, to eliminate wheel marks. Maisons Fortes were to be built near the frontier as permanently garrisoned works, whose men would alert the army, blow bridges and erect roadblocks, for which materials were dumped. About 1.5–2 mi (2.4–3.2 km) back were concrete Avant-postes with permanent garrisons armed with 47 mm or 65 mm guns, intended to delay an attacker so that buried casemates and ouvrages (fortresses) further back could be manned. Artificial obstacles of 4 to 6 rows of upright railway line, 10 ft (3.0 m)-long set in concrete and of random depth and covered by barbed wire. A barbed wire obstruction 20 ft (6.1 m) further back covered a field of anti-tank mines overlooked by twin machine-guns and anti-tank guns in casemates. The casemates were distributed in series and were the only defensive works along the Rhine; on other stretches, casemates were interspersed with ouvrages, every 3–5 mi (4.8–8.0 km). Interval Troops of infantry, gunners, engineers and mechanised light cavalry with field artillery, could manoeuvre between the fortifications, advancing to defend casemate approaches to relieve outposts or retiring to protect fortress entrances; the troops provided continuity, depth and mobility to the static defences. (Note: The main fortifications were single- and double-casemates, dug into hills from 0.25–1.25 mi (0.40–2.01 km) apart, with firing chambers containing machine-guns, anti-tank guns to enfilade the anti-tank and anti-infantry obstacles further forward. An upper floor was roofed by 5–12 ft (1.5–3.7 m) of concrete and living quarters for 25–35 men were built below, with walls 2–5 ft (0.61–1.52 m) thick behind an earth covering; a trench 10 ft (3.0 m) deep surrounded by barbed wire and grenade-throwers protected the work. Power came from diesel engines and the largest forts (ouvrages) had 1,000–1,200 infantry, gunners and engineers.)

The line was built in several phases from 1930 by the Service Technique du Génie (STG), overseen by Commission d'Organisation des Régions Fortifiées (CORF). The main construction was largely completed by 1939, at the cost of around 3 billion French francs (around 3.9 billion US dollars). The line stretched from Switzerland to Luxembourg and a much lighter extension was extended to the Strait of Dover after 1934. The original construction did not cover the area ultimately chosen by the Germans for their first challenge, which was through the Ardennes in 1940, a plan known as Fall Gelb (Case Yellow), due to the neutrality of Belgium. The location of this attack, chosen because of the location of the Maginot Line, was through the Belgian Ardennes Forest (sector 4), which is off the map to the left of Maginot Line sector 6 (as marked).

==== Features ====
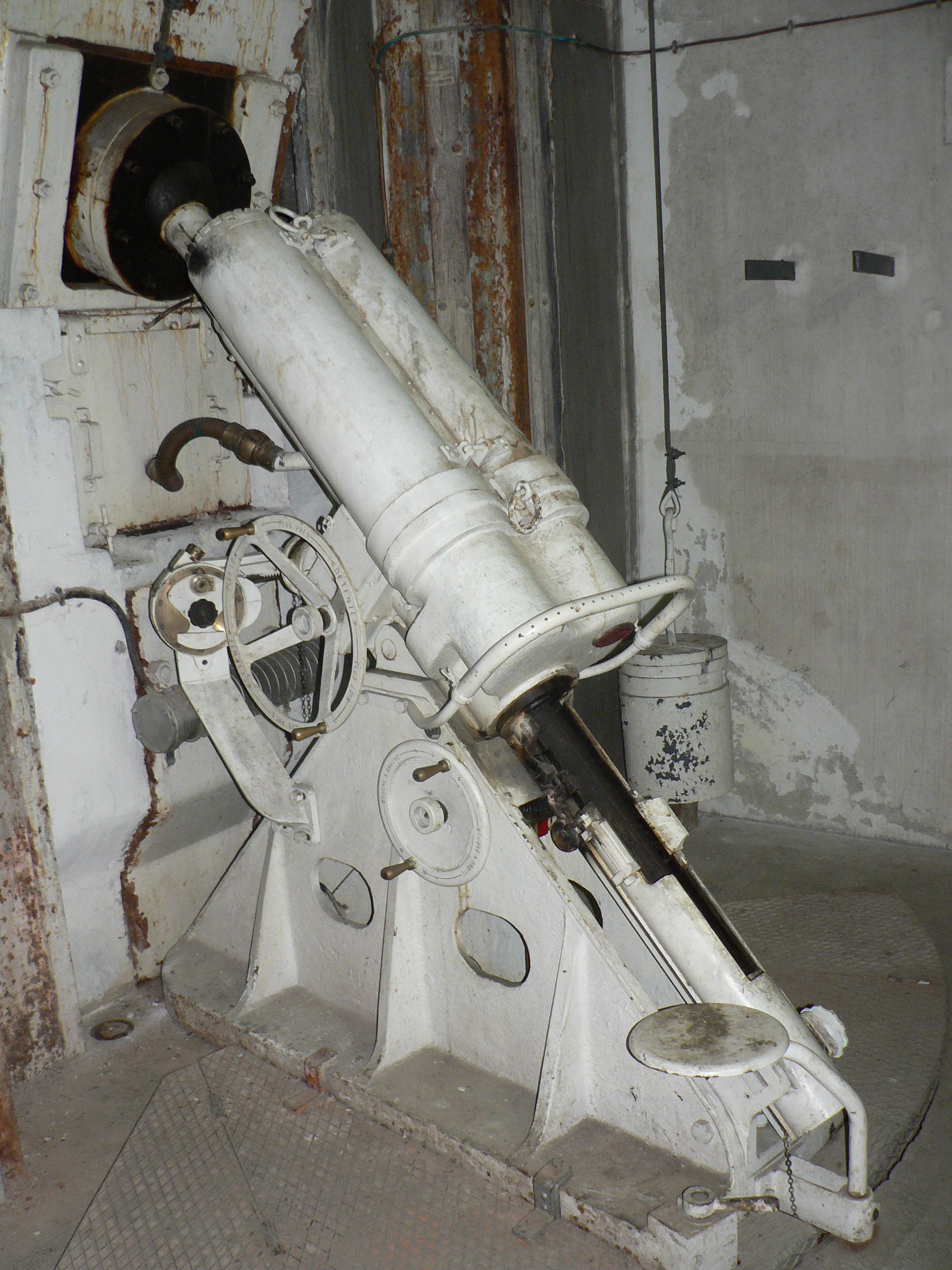
81 mm (3.2 in) mortar

The specifications for the defences were very high, with extensive and connected bunker complexes for thousands of men; there were 45 main forts (grands ouvrages) at intervals of 15 km (9.3 mi) and 97 smaller forts (petits ouvrages), interspersed with 352 casemates, with over 100 km (62 mi) of tunnels. Artillery was coordinated with protective measures to ensure that one fort could support the next in line by bombarding it directly without harm. The largest guns were, therefore 135 mm (5.3 in) fortress guns; larger weapons were to be part of the mobile forces and were to be deployed behind the lines.

The fortifications did not extend through the Ardennes Forest (which was believed to be impenetrable by Commander-in-Chief Maurice Gamelin) or along France's border with Belgium because the two countries had signed an alliance in 1920, by which the French army would operate in Belgium if German forces invaded. However, after France had failed to counter the German Remilitarization of the Rhineland in March 1936, Belgium ‐ thinking that France was not a reliable ally – abrogated the treaty later that year and declared neutrality. France quickly extended the Maginot Line along the Franco-Belgian border, but not to the standard of the rest of the line. As the water table in this region is high, there was the danger of underground passages flooding; the architects knew that this would be difficult and expensive to overcome.

In 1939 US Army officer Kenneth Nichols visited the Metz sector, where he was impressed by the formidable formations; he thought the Germans would have to outflank them by driving through Belgium. In discussion with General Brousseau, the commander of the Metz sector and other officers, the general outlined the French problem in extending the line to the sea – placing the line along the Belgian-German border required the agreement of Belgium, but putting the line along the French-Belgian border would abandon Belgium to the Germans. Another complication was neutral Holland, and the various governments never resolved their problems.

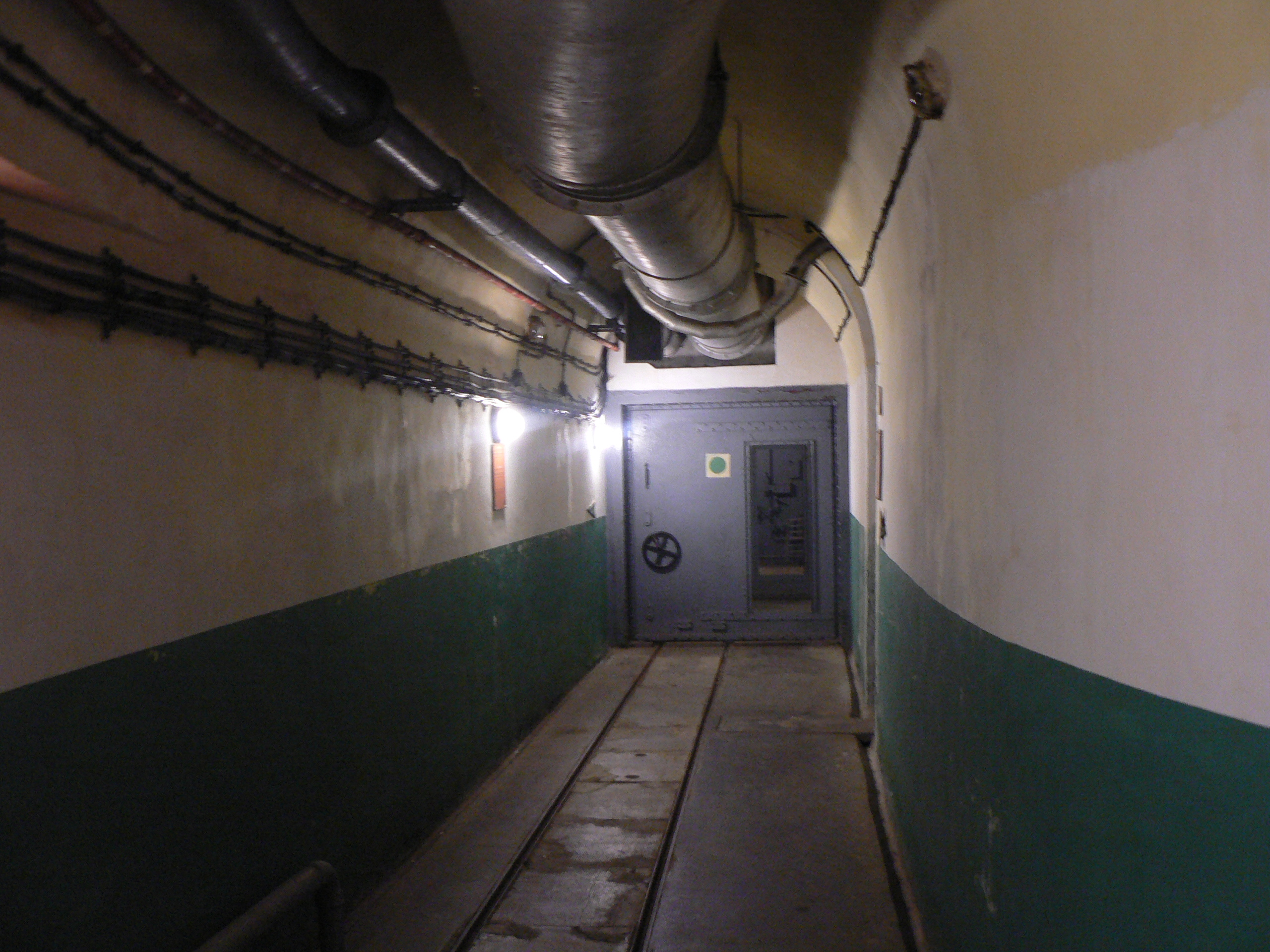
Corridor inside the Fort Saint-Gobain near Modane in the Alps. The Decauville

After the British Expeditionary Force landed in France in September 1939, they and the French reinforced and extended the Maginot line to the sea in a flurry of construction before the German attack in the second week of May 1940, accompanied by general improvements all along the line. The final line was strongest around the industrial regions of Metz, Lauter and Alsace, while other areas were, in comparison, only weakly guarded.

=== Czechoslovakia ===
Czechoslovakia also feared Hitler and began building its own defences. As an ally of France, they got advice on the Maginot design and applied it to Czechoslovak border fortifications. The design of the casemates is similar to the ones found in the southern part of the Maginot Line, and photographs of them are often confused with Maginot forts. Following the Munich Agreement and the German occupation of Czechoslovakia, the Germans were able to use the Czech fortifications to plan attacks that proved successful against the western fortifications (the Belgian Fort Eben-Emael is the best-known example).

=== German invasion in World War II ===
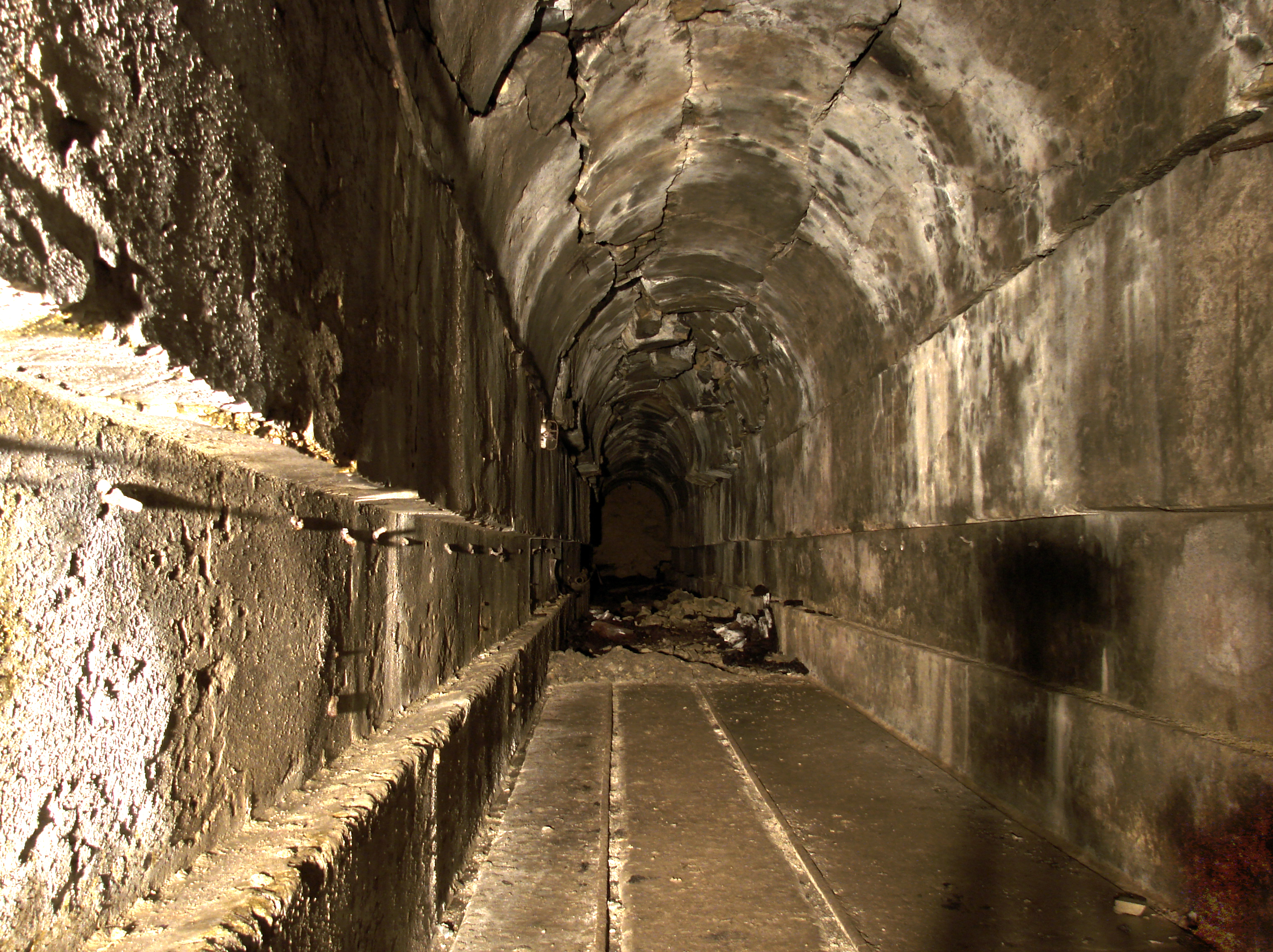
Combat block 1 at the fortress Limeiln (ouvrage Four-à-Chaux, Alsace), showing signs of German testing of explosives inside some fortresses between 1942 and 1944

The World War II German invasion plan of 1940 (Sichelschnitt) was designed to deal with the line. A decoy force sat opposite the line while a second Army Group cut through the Low Countries of Belgium and the Netherlands, as well as through the Ardennes, which lay north of the main French defences. Thus the Germans were able to avoid a direct assault on the Maginot Line by violating the neutrality of Belgium, Luxembourg and the Netherlands. Attacking on 10 May, German forces were well into France within five days and they continued to advance until 24 May, when they stopped near Dunkirk.

During the advance to the English Channel, the Germans overran France's border defence with Belgium and several Maginot Forts in the Maubeuge area whilst the Luftwaffe simply flew over it. On 19 May, the German 16th Army captured the isolated petit ouvrage La Ferté (south-east of Sedan) after conducting a deliberate assault by combat engineers backed up by heavy artillery, taking the fortifications in only four days. The entire French crew of 107 soldiers was killed during the action. On 14 June 1940, the day Paris fell, the German 1st Army went over to the offensive in "Operation Tiger" and attacked the Maginot Line between St Avold and Saarbrücken.

The Germans then broke through the fortification line as defending French forces retreated southward. In the following days, infantry divisions of the 1st Army attacked fortifications on each side of the penetration, capturing four petits ouvrages. The 1st Army also conducted two attacks against the Maginot Line further to the east in northern Alsace. One attack broke through a weak section of the line in the Vosges Mountains, but the French defenders stopped a second attack near Wissembourg. On 15 June, infantry divisions of the German 7th Army attacked across the Rhine River in Operation "Small Bear", deeply penetrating the defences and capturing the cities of Colmar and Strasbourg.

By early June, the German forces had cut off the line from the rest of France, and the French government was making overtures for an armistice, which was signed on 22 June in Compiègne. As the line was surrounded, the German Army attacked a few ouvrages from the rear but was unsuccessful in capturing any significant fortifications. The main fortifications of the line were still mostly intact, many commanders were prepared to hold out, and the Italian advance had been contained. Nevertheless, Maxime Weygand signed the surrender instrument and the army was ordered out of their fortifications to be taken to POW camps.

When the Allied forces invaded in June 1944, the line, now held by German defenders, was again largely bypassed; fighting touched only portions of the fortifications near Metz and in northern Alsace towards the end of 1944. During the German offensive Operation Nordwind in January 1945, Maginot Line casemates and fortifications were utilised by Allied forces, especially in the Bas-Rhin department in Grand Est, and some German units had been supplemented with flamethrower tanks in anticipation of this possibility. In January 1945 von Luck with the 21st Panzer Division was tasked with cutting through the old Maginot Line defences and severing Allied links with Strasbourg as part of Operation Nordwind. He was told there were no plans available of the Line but that it was "barely manned and constituted no obstacle". However they came up against fierce resistance and concentrated American artillery fire. They had to withdraw on 6 January 1945 and again after another attack on 8 January, although they drove a "tiny wedge" into the Line. Stephen Ambrose wrote that in January 1945, "a part of the line was used for the purpose it had been designed for and showed what a superb fortification it was." Here the Line ran east-west, around the villages of Rittershoffen and Hatten, south of Wissembourg.

=== After World War II ===
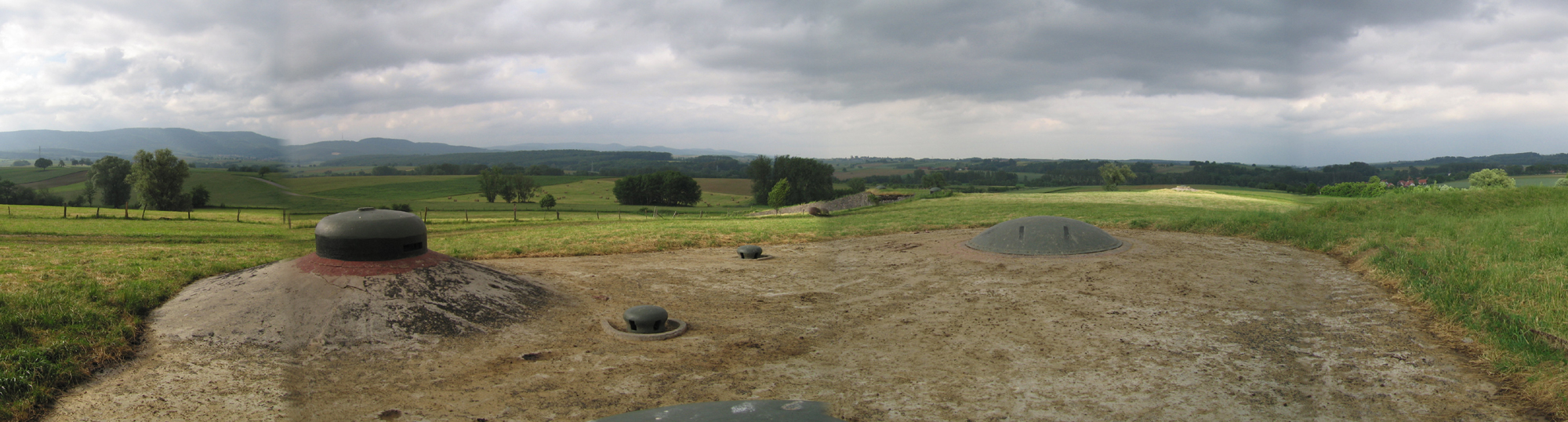
The view from a battery at Ouvrage Schoenenbourg in Alsace. A retractable turret is in the left foreground

After the war, the French re-manned the line and undertook some modifications. With the advent of French nuclear weapons in the early 1960s, the line became an expensive anachronism. Some of the larger ouvrages were converted to command centres. When France withdrew from NATO's military component in 1966, much of the line was abandoned, with the NATO facilities turned back over to French forces and the rest of it auctioned off to the public or left to decay. A number of old fortifications have been turned into various operations such as wine cellars and mushroom farms, with varying degrees of success. A few private houses are built atop some blockhouses.

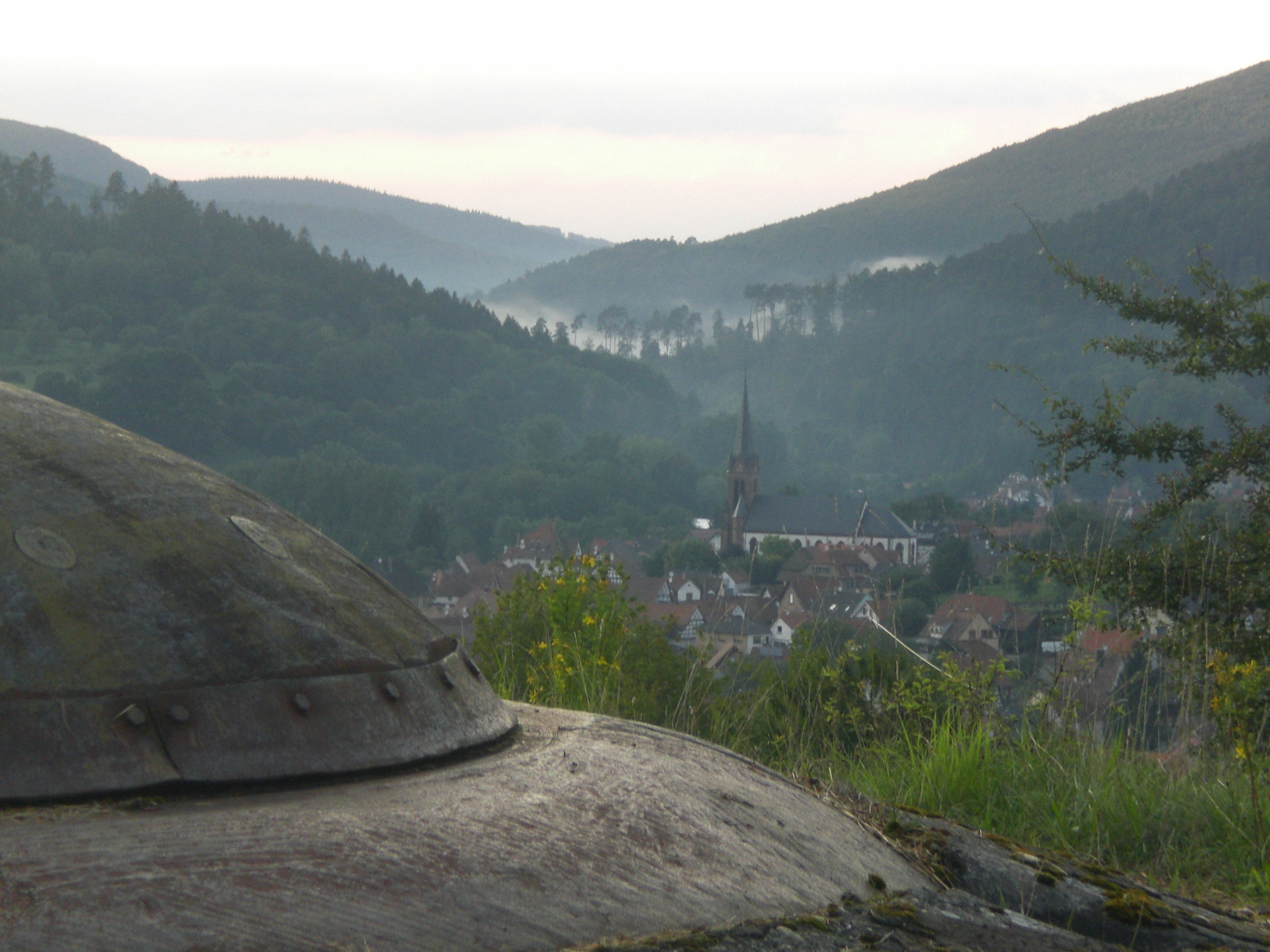
View of the village of Lembach in Alsace (north-east), taken from combat unit number 5 of the fortress ouvrage Four-à-Chaux

Ouvrage Rochonvillers was retained by the French Army as a command centre into the 1990s but was deactivated following the disappearance of the Soviet threat. Ouvrage Hochwald is the only facility in the main line that remains in active service as a hardened command facility for the French Air Force known as Drachenbronn Airbase.

In 1968, when scouting locations for On Her Majesty's Secret Service, producer Harry Saltzman used his French contacts to gain permission to use portions of the Maginot Line as SPECTRE headquarters in the film. Saltzman provided art director Syd Cain with a tour of the complex. Still, Cain said that the location would be challenging to light and film inside and that artificial sets could be constructed at the studios for a fraction of the cost. The idea was shelved.

== Postwar assessment ==
In analysing the Maginot Line, Ariel Ilan Roth summarised its main purpose: it was not "as popular myth would later have it, to make France invulnerable", but it was constructed to make the appeal of flanking the French "far outweigh the appeal of attacking them head on". J.E. Kaufmann and H.W. Kaufmann added that before construction in October 1927, the Superior Council of War adopted the final design for the line and identified that one of the main missions would be to deter a German cross-border assault with only minimal force to allow "the army time to mobilise." The French envisioned the Germans conducting another invasion through Belgium similar to the Schlieffen Plan to flank the defences and drew up their strategy with that in mind.

Julian Jackson wrote that one of the line's roles was to facilitate that strategy by "free[ing] manpower for offensive operations elsewhere... and to protect the forces of manoeuvre"; the latter included a more mechanised and modernised military, which would advance into Belgium and engage the German main thrust flanking the line. Roth commented that the French strategy saw one of two possibilities by advancing into Belgium: "either there would be a decisive battle in which France might win, or, more likely, a front would develop and stabilise". The latter meant the next war's destructive consequences would not take place on French soil.

Tunnel, Ouvrage Schoenenbourg, the decauville

Post-war assessment of whether the Maginot Line served its purpose has been mixed. Its enormous cost and its failure to prevent German forces from invading France have caused journalists and political commentators to remain divided on whether the line was worthwhile.

The historian Clayton Donnell commented, "If one believes the Maginot Line was built for the primary purpose of stopping a German invasion of France, most will consider it a massive failure and a waste of money... in reality, the line was not built to be the ultimate saviour of France". Donnell argued that the primary purpose of "prevent[ing] a concerted attack on France through the traditional invasion routes and to permit time for the mobilisation of troops... was fulfilled", as was the French strategy of forcing the Germans to enter Belgium, which ideally would have allowed "the French to fight on favourable terrain". He noted that the French failed to use the line as the basis for an offensive.

Marc Romanych and Martin Rupp wrote that "poor decisions and missed opportunities" plagued the line and point to its purpose of conserving manpower: "about 20 per cent of [France's] field divisions remained inactive along the Maginot Line". Belgium was overrun, and British and French forces forced into the Dunkirk evacuation. They argue had those troops been moved north, "it is possible that Heeresgruppe A's advance could have been blunted, giving time for Groupe d'armees 1 to reorganise". Kaufmann and Kaufmann commented, "When all is said and done, the Maginot Line did not fail to accomplish its original mission... it provided a shield that bought time for the army to mobilise... [and] concentrate its best troops along the Belgian border to engage the enemy."

The psychological factor of the Maginot Line has also been discussed. Its construction created a false sense of security, which was widely believed in by the French population. Kaufmann and Kaufmann comment that it was an unintended consequence of André Maginot's efforts to "focus the public's attention on the work being done, emphasising the role and nature of the line". That resulted in "the media exaggerating their descriptions by turning the line into an impregnable fortified position that would seal the frontier". The false sense of security contributed "to the development of the "Maginot mentality".

Jackson commented that "it has often been alleged that the Maginot Line contributed to France's defeat by making the military too complacent and defence-minded. Such accusations are unfounded". Historians have pointed to numerous reasons for the French defeat: faulty strategy and doctrine, dispersion of forces, the loss of control, poor communications, faulty intelligence that provided excessive German numbers, the slow nature of the French response to the German penetration of the Ardennes and a failure to understand the nature and speed of the German doctrine. Historians have noted that rather than the Germans doing what the French had envisioned, the French played into the Germans' hands, culminating in their defeat.

When the French Army failed in Belgium, the Maginot Line covered their retreat. Romanych and Rupp indicate that except for the loss of several insignificant fortifications from insufficient defending troops, the actual fortifications and troops "withstood the test of battle", repulsed numerous attacks, and "withstood intense aerial and artillery bombardment". Kaufmann and Kaufmann point to the Maginot Line along the Italian border, which "demonstrated the effectiveness of the fortifications... when properly employed".

== Cultural impact ==
The line features in "Imagine Me in the Maginot Line", a 1939 comedy song performed by the British comedian George Formby. It is sung in the voice of a member of the British Expeditionary Force stationed on the line.

The term "Maginot Line" has become a part of the English language: "America's Maginot Line" was the title used for an The Atlantic article about America's military bases in Asia. The article portrayed vulnerability by showing a rocket being transported through a marshy area atop an ox. New York Times headlined "Maginot Line in the Sky" in 2000 and "A New Maginot Line" in 2001. It was also frequently referenced in wartime films, notably Thunder Rock, The Major and the Minor (albeit as a comedic metaphor) and Passage to Marseille.

Somewhat like "line in the sand" it is also used in non-military situations, as in "Reagan's budgetary Maginot Line."

Canadian singer-songwriter Geoff Berner has a song called "Maginot Line" on his album We Shall Not, detailing the debacle.

== See also ==
- Atlantic Wall
- Bar Lev Line
- British hardened field defences of World War II
- Ceintures de Lyon
- Commission for Organising the Fortified Regions (CORF)
- Çakmak Line
- Czechoslovak border fortifications
- Gin Drinkers Line - a contemporary British fortified line in Hong Kong
- K-W Line – a contemporary defence line in Belgium
- List of Alpine Line ouvrages (works)
- List of Maginot Line ouvrages (works)
- Mareth Line - a contemporary French fortified line on the Tunisia / Libya border
- Metaxas Line
- Rupnik Line
- Siegfried Line
- Toblerone line

== Notes ==
Footnotes

Citations
