= NATO Ouvrage "G" =

Coordinates: 47°39′34.95″N 6°49′8.44″E

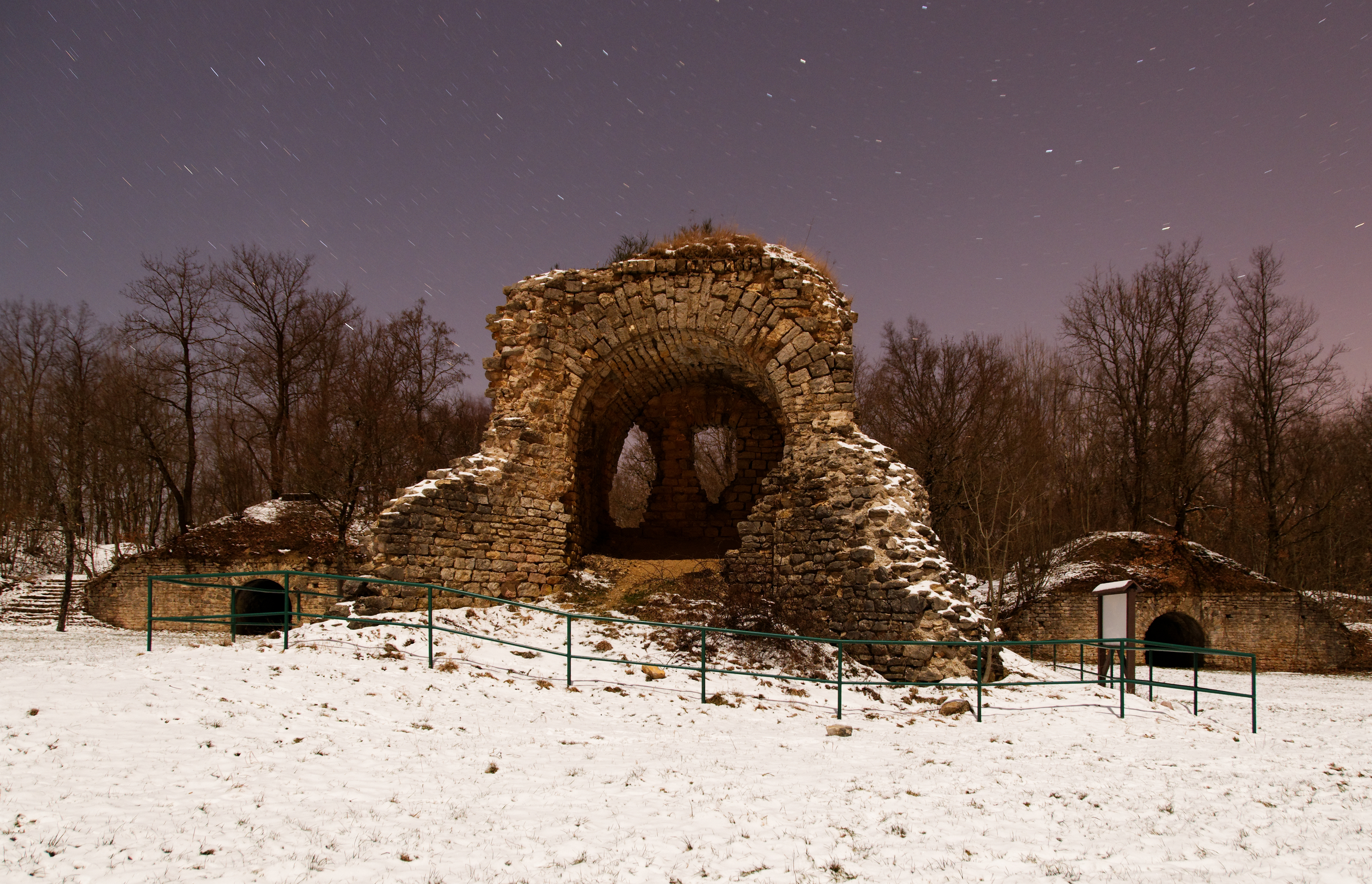
Fort under moonlight

From 1949 to March 10, 1967, France's military operated within the NATO command structure, integrating its air defense system (the Défense Aérienne du Territoire (D.A.T.)) with that of NATO through the indirect use of American aid funds. Between 1953 and 1958, the D.A.T. built a radar station in an old troops shelter (in French : abri-caverne) near fort du Salbert, called Ouvrage "G". Called "Station Maître Radar 60/921", it was used beginning in 1959, covering an area on the surface of three times the area of the troops shelter.

Ouvrage "G" complemented Ouvrage F, another D.A.T. station located at the old Fort François de Guise at Metz, while Ouvrage H was established as Base aérienne 901 Drachenbronn/Station Maître Radar 50/921 in the former Maginot Ouvrage Hochwald. Ouvrage "G" was equipped with seven radar antennas installed on top of the fort. The principal radars are presently located on the Ballon de Servance.

The Ouvrage « G » is composed, at this creation, to 3 elements:

- the fort du Salbert
- baraques Fillod (examples here)
- undergrounds buildings

The military vacated the Fort de Salbert in 1972 and removed the antennas from the fort. The city of Belfort took possession of the site. The foundations of the radars and the fort's heating oil tanks remain.

In 1990 Belfort concluded an agreement with an association without lucrative purpose named Les aventuriers de l'histoire to restore the site. The volunteer group cleaned, repaired, and worked to make the site ready for public visitation. The group's enthusiasm was tempered by repeated setbacks, culminating with the explosion of several improvised bombs on the site which released asbestos and made the site unusable for the public or for restoration work. By mutual agreement between the city and the volunteers, public access was discontinued and the aventuriers disbanded. Ouvrage "G" was closed, its doors welded shut.

== Description ==
Ouvrage "G" had four Alstom (Tarbes) 260-horsepower diesel generators, started with compressed air and provided with sufficient fuel for one month. In addition, it was provided with air conditioning and gas protection, designed to maintain an overpressure level to keep contaminants out. Blast doors were installed at personnel entrances.

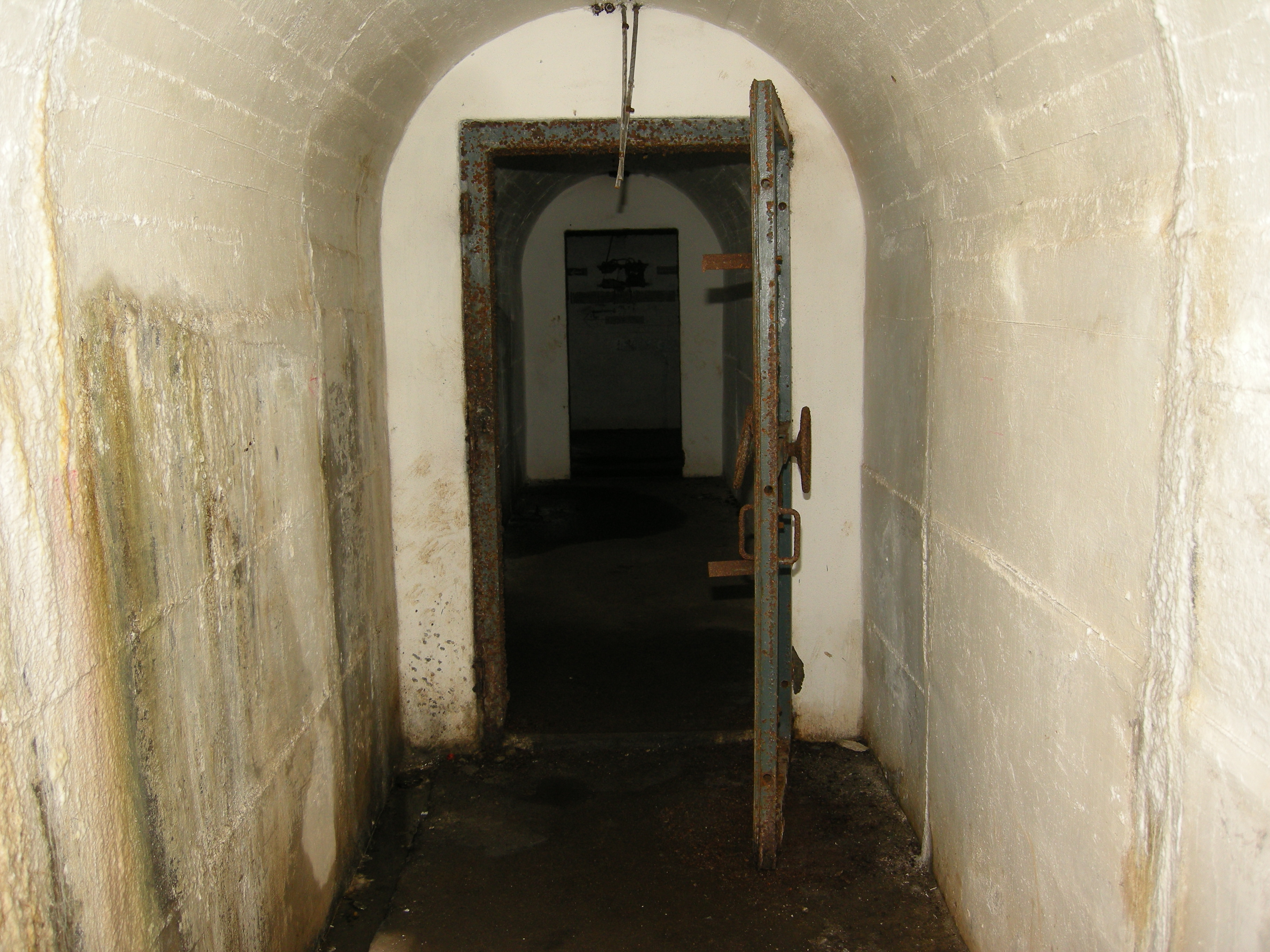
Personnel airlock of the Ouvrage "G"

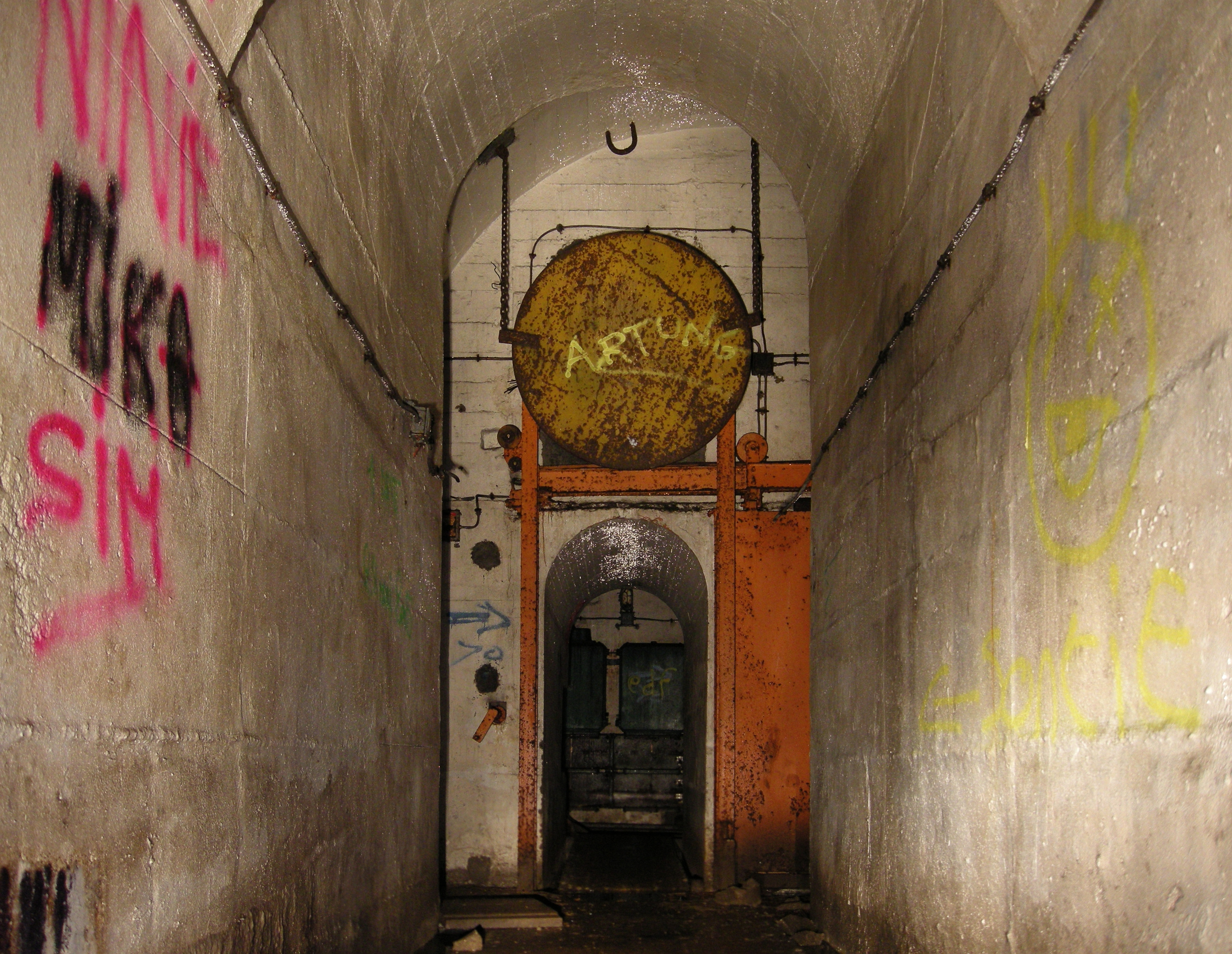
Security entrance at the gallery linking Ouvrage "G" to the rest of the fort

Six radar antennas and one microwave link to the Ballon de Servance were located on the fort's surface, with the electronic equipment in a room under each. The surveillance was managed from the central operations room. Arranged like an amphitheater, it was disposed on two levels of booths focusing on three map display tables:

- The display table (square) for the low-altitude network
- The filter table (rectangular) for the synthesis of all incoming information, also known as the "General Situation Table" and later the "Enemy Situation Table"
- The interception table, controlling interception missions by the defending forces

A map of the territory concerned was attached to each table. Markers were placed on the table to represent planes and associated information, moved about on the table by attendants with poles.

The operations room included a balcony for the observers who would transmit directions to the forces outside. Opposite the booths, four tote boards were placed on the walls:

- The "squadron tote", indicating the status of interceptor forces available
- The "mission tote", showing the interception missions assigned to the center
- The "weather tote", indicating weather conditions
- The "anti-aircraft tote", showing the situation of ground-based anti-aircraft defense units

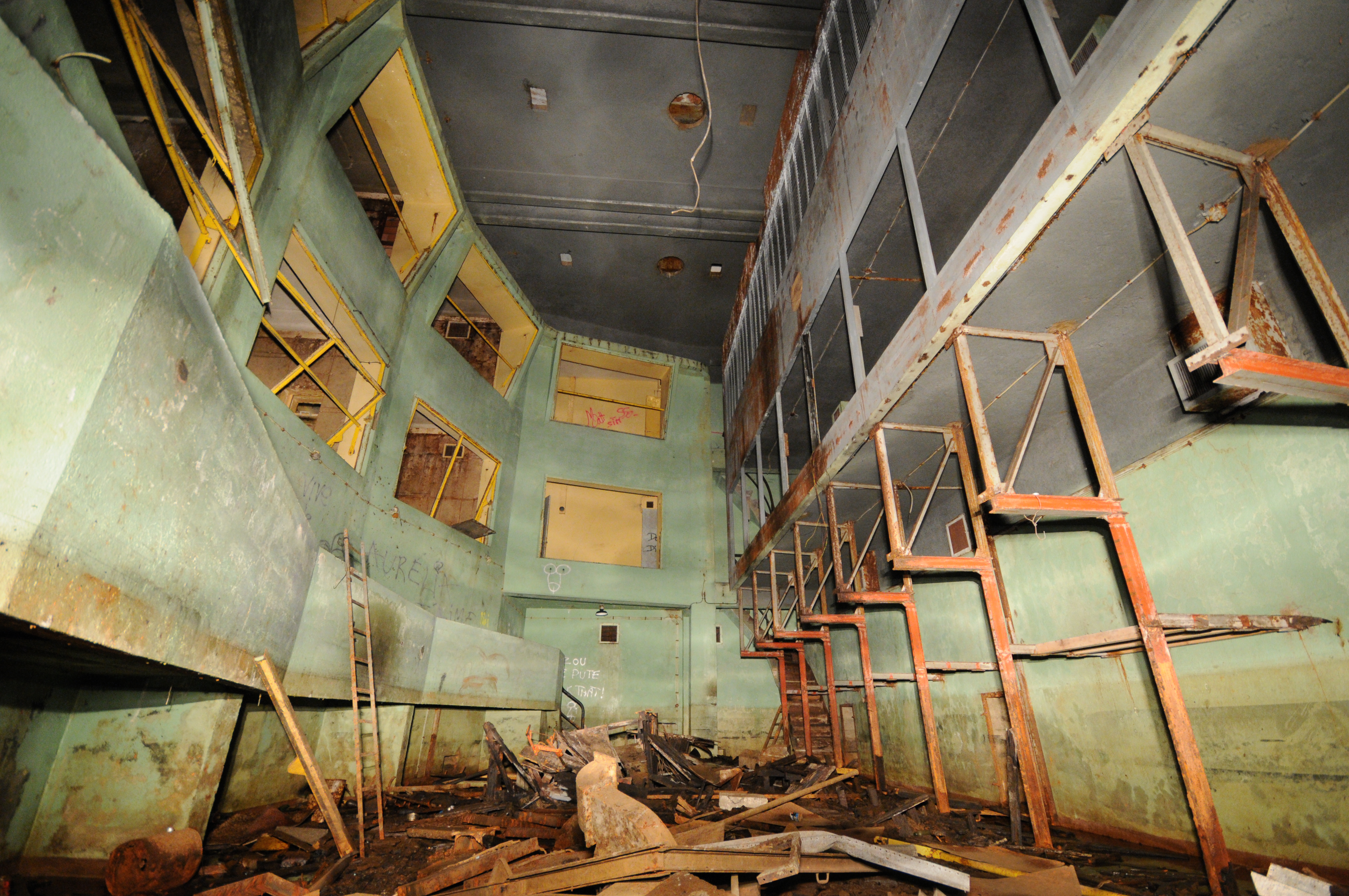
Operations center, in the Ouvrage "G".

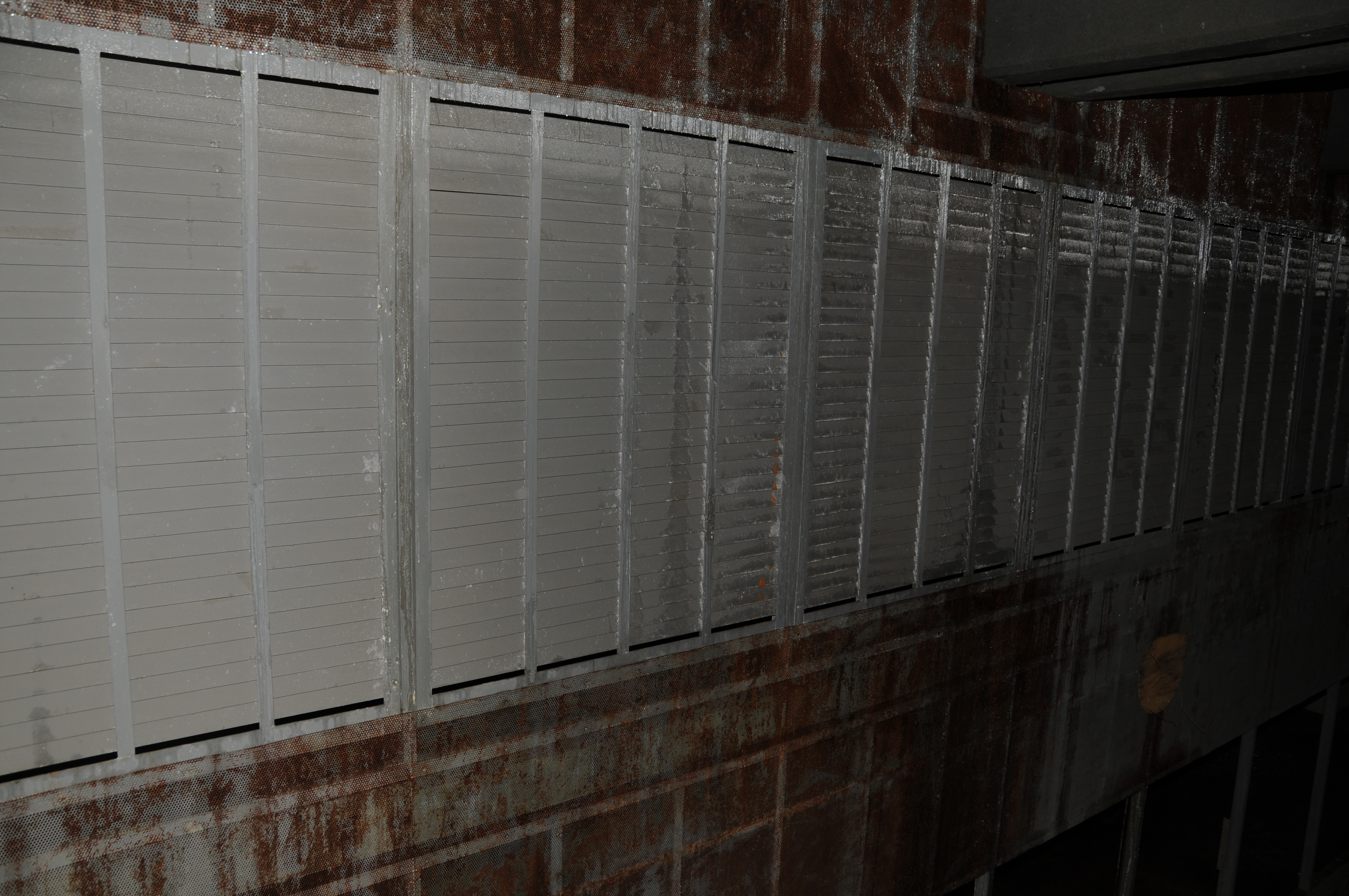
Detail of tote boards in the operations center, Ouvrage "G"

Booth assignments included those dedicated to identification, electronic countermeasures and three interception control stations. Other rooms that did not overlook the control room were provided for weather and technical control. The detection room housed the radar scopes showing the image generated by the radar system. The system used triangulation to establish the position of radar targets.

Ouvrage "G" was provided with three telecommunication networks:

- The civilian telephone system (reseau P.T.T.), vulnerable in wartime
- UHF radio and VHF radio, both telegraphic and data, permitting communication with the facilities on the Ballon de Servance
- The terrestrial network of the D.A.T.

Security for Ouvrage "G" was provided by personnel from Luxeuil Air Base. While the facility was designed for 500 occupants, it was in reality occupied by about 350. During its period of operation the nature and details of the base were secret. In 1959 operations at Salbert were terminated and the force reduced to maintenance and security, with the surveillance function detailed to Ballon de Servance. The station had been fully operational for scarcely two years. The station was decommissioned due to the obsolescence of its radars, whose short range, low altitude coverage and poor performance made them of limited use. Consolidation and automation of radar surveillance made the Salbert facility obsolete. The station was fully maintained in operating order until 1972, when it was turned over to Belfort.

In 1966 Radiodiffusion-Télévision Française (RTF) placed a television transmitter on the site. In 1969 a relay station for Air Force communications was installed at the fort. In the summers of 1969 and 1970 the barracks were used as a military rest and recreational facility. In 1971 two receivers for the service de transmission de l'intérieur (S.T.I.) were installed for the benefit of the prefecture of Dijon. After negotiations with the Army, the city of Belfort purchased the Fort de Salbert in 1972.

During the summer and autumn of 1972, military engineers salvaged machinery and materials from the site. The barracks were dismantled. Belfort took possession on October 15, 1972. After the city took possession the site became a popular recreation area. In 1978 the city decided to redevelop the summit. Work began the same year and was finished in 1983. A P.T.T. tower was placed on the site in 1976.

== See also ==
- Fortified region of Belfort
- Fort de Giromagny, Salbert's neighbor to the north
