= Commandement de la Défense Aérienne et des Opérations Aériennes =

The Commandement de la Défense Aérienne et des Opérations Aériennes (CDAOA or Air Defence and Air Operations Command) is one of three commands of the French Air and Space Force. It is essentially the organisation that controls the air defence of France and routine air force training.

The Centre de détection et de contrôle militaire (CDC) are the regional radar centres, which pass information to the Centre de Conduite des Opérations Aériennes (CCOA), which notifies the central CDAOA.

== Structure ==
Until 1 September 2007, it was headquartered at the Taverny Air Base in the Val-d'Oise department in northern France. At Taverny Air Base, the CCOA and CDAOA were on the same site.

  - Air Defence and Air Operations Staff (French: État-major de la défense aérienne et des opérations aériennes) composed of the:
    - Air Force Operational Staff (French: État-major opérationnel Air (EMO-Air)) and the
    - Permanent readiness command center (French: Centre de permanence Air), both situated at the Balard complex (the French Air and Space Force main HQ)
    - direct reporting units:
      - Air Force Operations Brigade (French: Brigade aérienne des opérations (BAO)) (all units at BA 942 Lyon-Mont Verdun air base)
        - National Air Operations Center (French: Centre national des opérations aériennes (CNOA))
        - Core Joint Force Air Component HQ (Core JFAC HQ)
        - Operational Center for Military Surveillance of Space Objects (French: Centre opérationnel de surveillance militaire des objets spatiaux (COSMOS))
        - Analysis and Simulation Center for Air Operations Preparation (French: Centre d’analyse et de simulation pour la préparation aux opérations aériennes (CASPOA))
      - Air Force Operational Awareness and Planning Brigade (French: Brigade aérienne connaissance-anticipation (BACA))
        - Air Force Intelligence Center (French: Centre de renseignement air (CRA)) at BA 942 Lyon-Mont Verdun air base
        - National Target Designation Center (French: Centre national de ciblage (CNC)) at BA 110 Creil-Senlis air base
        - Satellite Observation Military Center 01.092 "Bourgogne" (French: Centre militaire d’observation par satellites (CMOS) 01.092 Bourgogne) at BA 110 Creil-Senlis air base
        - Land-based Electronic Warfare Squadron (French: Escadron électronique sol (EES)) at BA 123 Orléans-Bricy air base
        - Intelligence Training Squadron 20.530 (French: Escadron de formation au renseignement (EFR) 20.530) (Metz), training air and space force and naval officers, integrated in the Joint Intelligence Training Center (CFIAR) in Strasbourg
    - territorial units:
      - Detection and Control Center 07.927 (French: Centre de détection et de contrôle (CDC)) Tours – Cinq-Mars-la-Pile (Codename: Raki, AOR: Northwestern France)
      - Detection and Control Center 04.930 (French: Centre de détection et de contrôle (CDC)) Mont-de-Marsan (Codename: Marina, AOR: Southwestern France)
      - Detection and Control Center 05.942 (French: Centre de détection et de contrôle (CDC)) Lyon – Mont Verdun (Codename: Rambert, AOR: Southeastern France)
      - Detection and Control Center 05.901 (French: Centre de détection et de contrôle (CDC)) Drachenbronn (Codename: Riesling, AOR: Northeastern France) – disbanded in 2015, functions absorbed into the Lyon – Mont Verdun DCC

== Commanders ==
Since September 2021, the head of the organisation has been Lieutenant-General Philippe Moralès.

== See also ==
- French air defence radar systems
- List of Escadres of the French Air and Space Force
