= Musée Pierre-Jost =

Fortification and museum in France

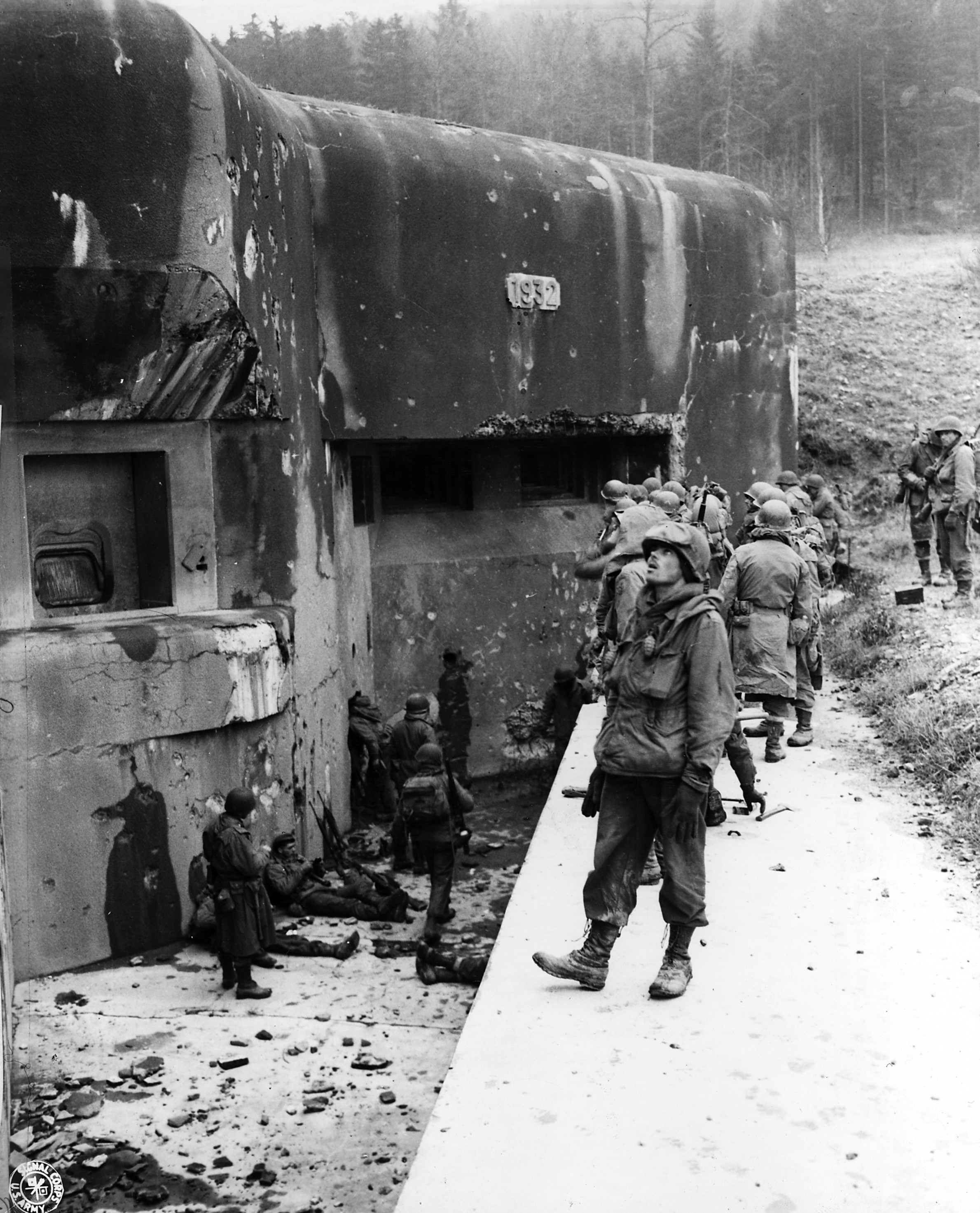
- American soldiers at the Hochwald West Fortress, Bloc 13, in 1944

- Location within France
- Established: 1972
- Coordinates: 48.983259°N 7.862349°E
- Collection size: Military

The Musée Pierre-Jost (Pierre Jost Museum) is situated near the Ouvrage Hochwald, one of the major fortifications of the Maginot Line in France, near to the village of Drachenbronn in the commune of Drachenbronn-Birlenbach, Alsace. It documents the story of the fortification before, during and after World War II. Le musée a fermé depuis la fermeture de la B.A.901

== Sites ==
The Ouvrage Hochwald fortification was built in the Hochwald massif between 1929 and 1935, and was the strongest in Alsace. It was capable of housing 1,200 men. It had eleven blocks, with turrets, casemates to house the infantry, three entry blocks and an anti-tank ditch. Construction of the museum in honor of the builders and defenders of the Maginot line began in 1972, led by Pierre Jost. The museum was set up in the old M1 magazine.

The original museum was closed in 2009 since it no longer met public safety standards. On 12 September 2011 the museum was re-opened in building T4 at airbase 901 in Drachenbronn-Birlenbach. The new premises, opened in time for Heritage Day on 18 September 2011, has more than 350 square metres (3,800 sq ft) of space.

== Museum ==
The first room has some artillery pieces in use until 1940, and press clippings of the early days of liberation towards the end of World War II. The museum has rooms for exhibits that cover each period in the life of the fortification: construction in 1930–1935 and occupation by the French in 1935–1940, occupation by the Germans in 1940–1945 and the cold war, when the fortification was viewed as defense against Soviet tanks advancing towards Paris. The room for the 1935–1940 period has the equipment, arms and personal effects of soldiers of that period. The 1940–1945 room has German propaganda posters and relics from the liberation. Part of the museum also tells the story of the airbase. There are many photographs showing the daily life of the soldiers during the different periods.

== Notes and references ==
Citations

Sources

- Brown, Bertrand (2011). "Ouverture du nouveau musée de la Base aérienne 901". L'Echarpe Blanche.
- "Le musée déménage" (PDF). Les Dernières Nouvelles d'Alsace. 11 September 2011.
- "L'ouvrage du Hochwald". La Ligne Maginot.
- "Musée Pierre JOST". drachenbronn-birlenbach.fr. Archived from the original on 2012-03-29.
