= Hochwald =

Hochwald may refer to:

- Hochwald, Switzerland, district of Dorneck in the canton of Solothurn
- Hochwald (Zittau Mountains) (749 m), a mountain in the Zittau Mountains, Saxony, Germany
- Hochwald (Swabian Jura) (1002 m), a mountain in the Swabian Jura, Baden-Württemberg, Germany
- Hochwald, a peak in the Hunsrück in Rhineland-Palatinate, Germany
- Hochwald, a part of the town of Waldbröl in North Rhine-Westphalia, Germany
- Hukvaldy, a village in the Czech Republic, known as Hochwald in German
- Hochwald (Alsace) (508 m), a hill ridge in north Alsace, southwest of Wissembourg, France
- Osburger Hochwald, a region of the Hunsrück mountains in Rhineland-Palatinate, Germany
- Ouvrage Hochwald, a fortification on the Maginot Line in the Bas-Rhin department of northeastern France
- Schwarzwälder Hochwald, a region of the Hunsrück mountains in Saarland and Rhineland-Palatinate, Germany
- Uedemer Hochwald, a forested ridge west of the German town of Xanten and the place of Operation Blockbuster in World War II

== See also ==
- High forest (woodland) (German hochwald means "high forest")
