= Nice Air Base =

Military airbase

Coordinates: 43°46′16″N 7°25′10″E

Nice Air Base (Base Aérienne 943 Nice "Capitaine Auber") of the French Air Force is divided between two sites: one at the summit of Mont Agel near Nice in the Alpes-Maritimes département, and the other at Gardanne barracks in Roquebrune-Cap-Martin. The Mont Agel base uses the facilities of the former Ouvrage Mont Agel of the Alpine Line. Its mission is the surveillance of aviation movements in southeastern France, operating as Centre de Détection et de Contrôle (CDC) 05.943, tactical call sign “Rhodia radar”. A similar facility is located at Drachenbronn Air Base in northeastern France. The Gardanne base houses administrative functions and personnel housing in a former Chasseur Alpins barracks.

BA943 is responsible for the identification of all aircraft in its zone of responsibility, and for the coordination of military air traffic in the southeastern airspace of France. The facility has the capacity to interact with E-3F and E-2C airborne control aircraft. It is equipped with a 23 cm two-dimensional search radar and a three-dimensional "PALMIER" radar on the site. Data is integrated by a VISU IV system.

== See also ==
- Alpine Line
- French air defense radar systems
