= Austrian air defense =

Air defence system of Austria

Austrian air defence is the air defense system that protects the nation of Austria. It integrates civilian and military radar systems under the authority of the Austrian Air Force.

Austrian air force roundel

== History ==
From 1964 to 1970 the first, fixed radar-station Kolomannsberg near Salzburg was developed. It combined with support from two-dimensional radar data from civil airports and mobile Bendix AN/TPS-1 search radars.

=== Goldhaube ===
From 1970 to 1983 the Goldhaube radar system was planned and activated. It included the purchase of an Italian Selenia (nowadays Alenia) RAT-31S & MRCS-403 radar system, planning and building of the Einsatzzentrale/Basisraum (government crisis bunker), the building of the fixed radar stations Speikkogel and Steinmandl and the airtraffic control center Schnirchgasse Wien (Vienna).It is named after a traditional Austrian women's cap.

In 1973 a combined civil/military project Flugverkehrskontrolle - Luftraumüberwachung (airtraffic and airspace control) was inaugurated to integrate both services. In 1975 the Stab Luftraum Beobachtungs System (air control staff) was activated in the Austrian air force.

Military requirements included determining the altitude of aircraft sightings as well as seeing beyond Austria's borders was absolutely necessary. After the evaluation authorities approved a three-dimensional radar system in which distance, heading and altitude were incorporated in a single radar picture.

Austrian military staff decided to buy the Italian Selenia RAT-31S / MRCS-403 instead of the American Westinghouse AN/TPS-43E system.

The Selenia system suffered development problems in the mid-1980s, delaying activation.

From 1997 to 2000 Austria ordered and activated EF2000 Typhoon Eurofighter interceptors and ordered a Long-Range Radar (RAT-31DL) system extension.

From 2000 to 2007 24 Saab Draken fighter interceptors were decommissioned, additional Eurofighters were ordered, 12 F-5E Tiger II aircraft on loan from Switzerland were decommissioned, IRIS-T missiles were procured for the Eurofighters and the RAT-31DL on Kolomannsberg achieved operational readiness.

== Operational elements ==
The Einsatzzentrale/Basisraum (EZ/B) is a command center and government crisis bunker, situated 300m inside a mountain near the village of Heukareck, in the vicinity of St. Johann and Salzburg. The bunker, known by some as "der Berg" (the mountain), was built from 1977–1982 to house military and civilian leadership during a crisis. The three main radar stations are located on the mountains of Kolomannsberg, Koralpe and Buschberg.

- Kommando Luftraumüberwachung (Kdo LRÜ). The airspace control command.
  - Betriebsstab (ready staff). Responsible for the technical status of the Einsatzzentrale/Basisraum (government crisisbunker), for the airspace control and for the alerting of air defence fighters.
  - Luftraumüberwachungszentrale (LRÜZ). (control reporting centre). Responsible for active and passive airspace control on a 24/7 basis by means of the operational air defence system and by means of producing an actual airpicture exceeding Austria's boundaries.
  - Beobachtungs- and Identification service (controlling and identification service). Responsible for the delivery of an actual airpicture.
  - Radarleitdienst (radar control service). Responsible for guiding alerted fighter interceptors using radar, radio and datalink
  - Analyse- und Dokumentationsteam (analysis - documentation team). Coördinates the activated sensor capacity and responsible for the data quality.
  - Dateneingabestelle (manual input service). Grants flight permits to all foreign military airplanes and is responsible for correct flight information.
  - Military Control Center (MCC). This operational unit is the real interface between both civil and military flight security authorities.
  - Wetterdienstzentrale (WEDZ). The military weather forecasting organisation.
  - EDV-LRÜ. Responsible for IT-handling and operational servicing of all stationary IT facilities and system upgrades.
  - Technische Betriebszentrale (TEBZ) Technical maintenance. Responsible for all technical installations in the EZ/B (government bunker).
  - Rettungs- und Brandschutzdienst (RuBSD) Internal fire and rescue brigade. Responsible for all active and passive fire control in the EZ/B bunker.
  - Radar station commando (RadStat) Radar command. Responsible for the overall operational capacity of the complete radar network.
    - Fixed radar station Kolomannsberg (ORS K)
    - Fixed radar station Steinmandl (ORS STM)
    - Fixed radar station Speikkogel (ORS SPK)
  - Radar bataillon (RadB). Responsible for all personnel and materiel operational readiness of all mobile air controlcomponents and radar control services
    - Mobile radar station 1 (MRS 1)
    - Mobile radar station 2 (MRS 2)
    - 6 x lowlevel detection radar
    - Operational shelter (deployable CRC)
    - Mobile direct relay stations
    - Mobile land communication facilities
    - Mobile air communication facilities
    - Technisch Logistisches Zentrum (TLZ) The technical logistics centre is direct responsible for communications between stations.

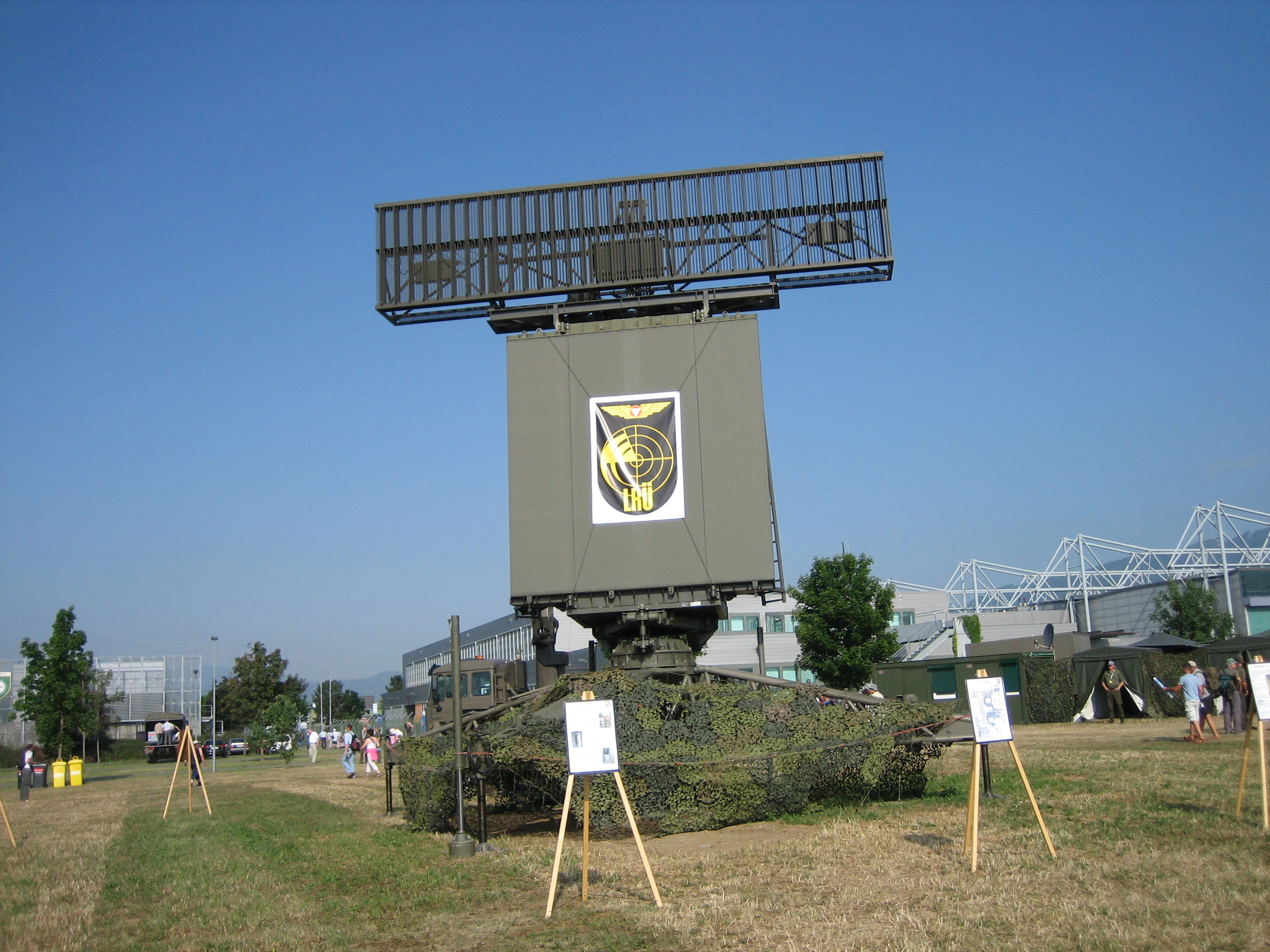
Alenia MRS1 station

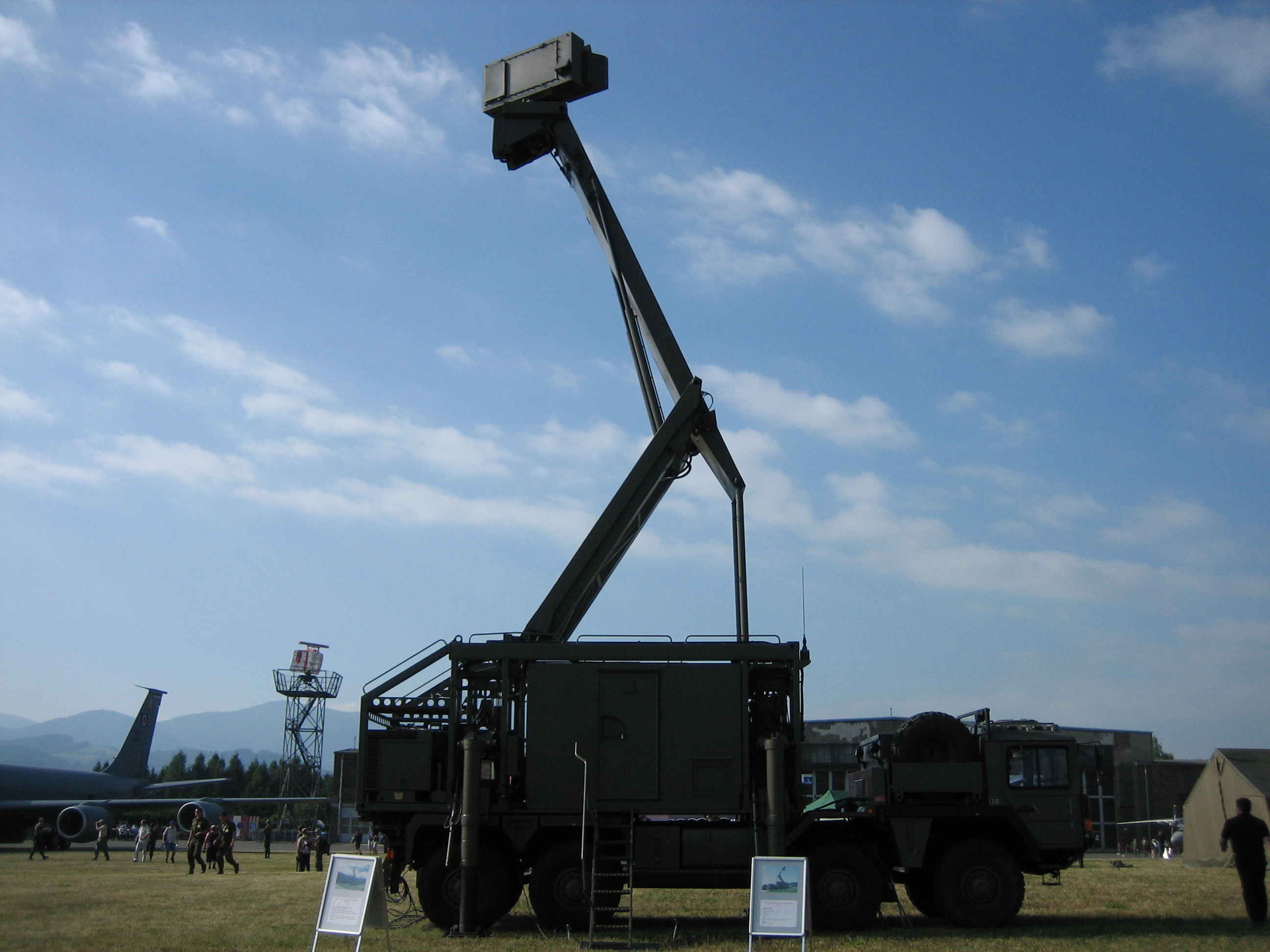
Thales lowlevel detection radar

== See also ==
- French air defense radar systems
- Swiss air defense
