= Fort du Salbert =

Fortification in Belfort, France

- Part of Fortified region of Belfort
- Belfort, France
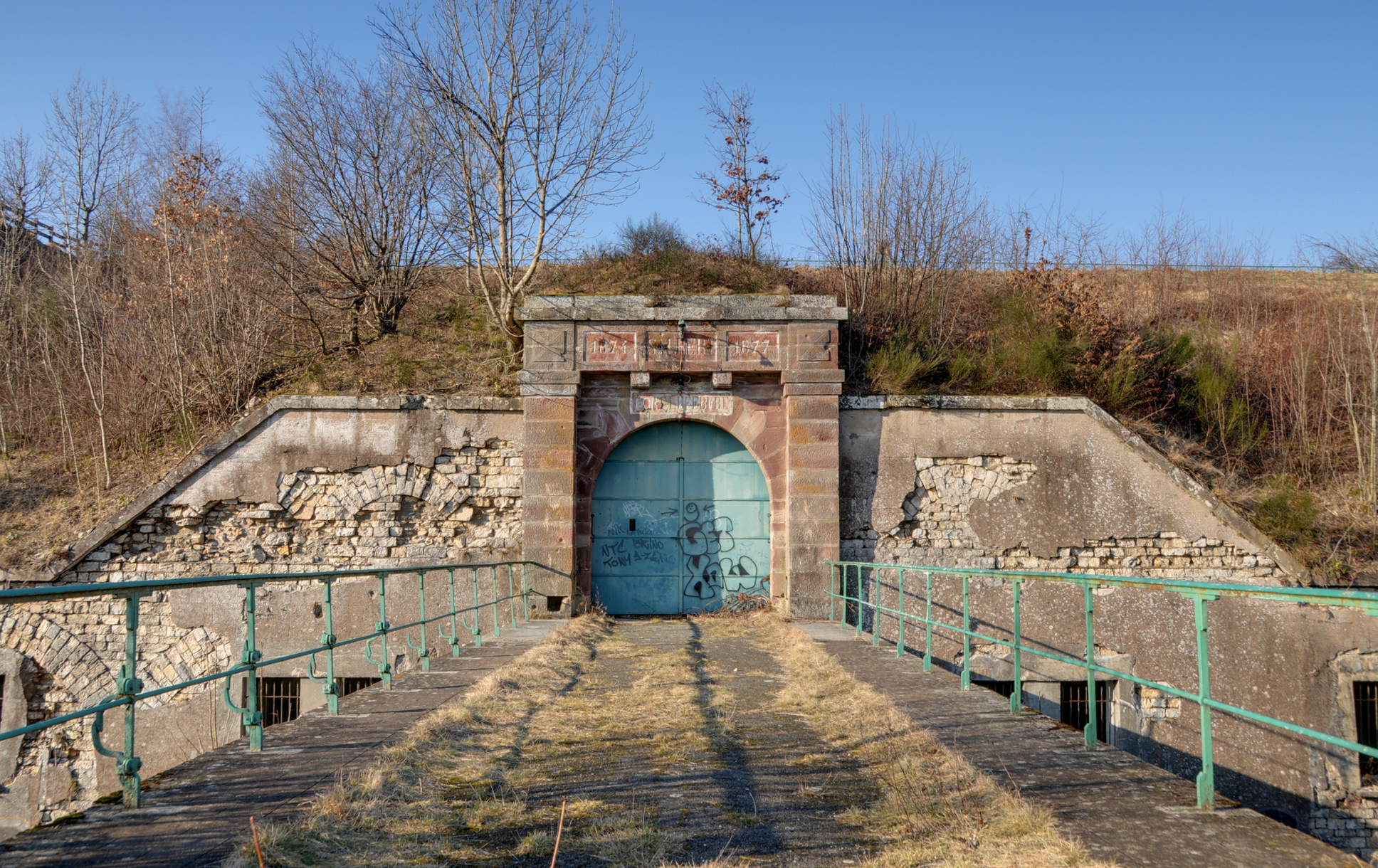

Site information
- Type: Fort, Séré de Rivières system
- Owner: City of Belfort
- Controlled by: France
- Open to the public: No
- Condition: Abandoned

Location
- Coordinates: 47.6596°N 6.8137°E

Site history
- Built: 1874

Fort du Salbert, also known as Fort Lefebvre, was built between 1874 and 1877. It was named after General François Joseph Lefebvre. It forms part of the Séré de Rivières system fortifications in the fortified region of Belfort in northeastern France. It is located at the summit of Salbert hill to the northwest of Belfort. During the early years of the Cold War it briefly served as an air defense coordination center.

Plan of the original Séré de Rivières fort

== Séré de Rivières fort ==
Fort du Salbert is one of the second ring of forts around Belfort, built about 5000 to 6000 meters outside the first ring of the 1840s. All of the new generation of forts abandoned sheer walls and bastions in favor of low earth-covered mounds to better resist artillery.

After it became apparent that masonry forts would not resist explosive shells, the fort was modernized beginning in 1885 with concrete over the caponiers and the creation of underground shelters for troops. From 1893 the fort was connected to other Belfort forts by the Chemins de fer du Territoire de Belfort strategic railroad. The fort was equipped with optical semaphores allowing communications with other forts. During the First World War a number of underground galleries were constructed to link the caponiers to the caserne.

Fort du Salbert commands an area of ponds surrounding Malsaucy, and controls roads to Lure, Giromagny and the Paris rail line. Its initial construction cost was 2,120,332 francs d'or. Initial manning was 460 men, 24 non-commissioned officers, and 13 officers. A well and cistern provided water. Armament in 1882 was five 155 mm long guns, eight 120 mm long guns, and a variety of small mortars and small-caliber guns for close defense.

A 1900 modernization was to add a Galopin armored twin 155 mm gun turret and an armored observation post. The gun turret project was abandoned, along with a further addition of a machine gun turret and a 75mm gun turret. The main fort never received the extensive concrete cover that was applied to other Séré de Rivières forts.

During the quarrying of the fort's stone the caves of Cravanche were discovered in 1876.

Currently, the fort has lost much of its original appearance (late nineteenth century) due to the creation in 1950 of the Ouvrage "G" de la D.A.T. that required modernization of the fort. The part of the fort which was used as this shelter is currently accessible to visitors by means of a guided tour run by a preservation association which was created in 2016.

== See also ==
- Fortified region of Belfort
- Fort de Giromagny, Salbert's neighbor to the north
