= Drachenbronn Air Base =

French air base in the Bas-Rhin département

Drachenbronn Air Base
- Base Aérienne 901 Drachenbronn
- Part of Nancy – Ochey Air Base
- Drachenbronn-Birlenbach, Bas-Rhin in France

Site information
- Owner: Government of France
- Operator: Armée de l'air et de l'espace

Location
- Coordinates: 48°59′04″N 07°50′01″E

Site history
- Built: 1952

Drachenbronn Air Base (Base Aérienne 901 Drachenbronn) of the French Air and Space Force is located in the community of Drachenbronn-Birlenbach in the Bas-Rhin département. It houses the Centre de détection et de contrôle 05/901.

The base uses the underground facilities of the former Ouvrage Hochwald of the Maginot Line. Its mission is the surveillance of aviation movements in eastern France. Under budget cuts announced in October 2014 it will become an outstation of Nancy – Ochey Air Base.

== History ==
In 1946 the Air Force began studies for the creation of a radar station on top of the ouvrage. Construction began in 1952, and in 1955 major construction was undertaken in the ouvrage for a radar control room and operations center, which was placed in operation in 1957, originally designated Station Maître Radar 50/921. The facility was briefly called Ouvrage H and was connected by data links to Ouvrage G at the Fort du Salbert near Belfort and Ouvrage F at Fort François de Guis at Metz. In 1960 the facility was renamed Base Aérienne 901. In 1991 the base was named for Commandant de Laubier, a hero of the defense of Sedan in 1940.

The operations center was again renovated in 1964 to accommodate the VISU/STRIDA II system, and again in 1984 for the VISU/STRIDA IV system. It was yet again renovated in 2007 with a new operations room.

A three-dimensional radar was installed on the nearby Hochwald hill, which dominates the Alsace plain and the Rhine valley.

== See also ==
- Maginot Line
- French air defence radar systems
