= French air defence radar systems =

The French air defence organisation is integrated in the military Armée de l’Air (ALA), the French Air Force.

The defence of the French national airspace has always been based on 2 main aspects:

- the peacetime security of the French airspace. This assignment is executed according to the fixed conditions of the French prime minister collaborating with the ministers of transport, foreign affairs, industrial, postal and communication services, interior management and colonial management.
- the national military air defence consisting of all defensive and counteroffensive measures against eventual aggressors.

In peacetime, the air defence and air operations command develops and evaluates all possible classic assets of air operations in all kinds of theatres. In times of crisis or at war, the air defence and air operations command is responsible for all offensive and defensive air operations.

The Commandement de la défense aérienne et des opérations aériennes (CDAOA) is the air defence and air operations command, and has the following primary missions:

- to decelerate and to evaluate any possible threats to the country by controlling the French and surrounding airspace by radar
- to present an actual airpicture on a 24/7 basis to all civilian and military authorities on which strategic decisions may be made
- to secure the airsuperiority in the national airspace at all times
- to prevent or to stop the use of the national airspace by any kind of aggressor
- to alert all civilian and military authorities in case of surprise air attacks

CDAOA secondary, peacetime, missions are:

- to command and control all military air traffic in cooperation with the civilian air traffic under the authority of the minister of transport
- to command and control all search and rescue operations in case of civilian or military air accidents

In case of need the main CDAOA functions will always be guaranteed on all theatres by the activation of air, ground or sea mobile detection units of all French armed forces. These units may be deployed at any time to support the fixed operational systems.

== System elements ==
- STRIDA (Système de Traitement et de Représentation des Informations de Défense Aérienne, lit. "System for processing and representing air defence information") is the radar itself. They equip the CDAOA, the CCOA, the CDC's and the UDA
- PALMIER. are 3-dimensional and 2-dimensional radars in the 23 cm wavelength. They feed information to the CDCs, which exchange their radar inputs from the other CDC's, from foreign allied NATO CRC's and from the E-3F and E-2C planes to complete the situation awareness.
- VISU- IV/ -V are computerised workspaces staffed and operated by military controllers that can be operated in control mode or surveillance mode. A senior controller is always in charge of supervising the operators. The VISU- IV/ -V equip the CDCs and UDA.
- METEOR and ETEC are radio and datalink communication systems. They constitute the primary means of transmission, though telephone and radio transmissions may also be sent via other specific sources in the defence network, such as Socrate or MTBA, or even through the installations of France Télécom.

== Air defence chain of command ==
The operational air defence chain of command consist of 3 main parts.

- The Centre de Conduite des Opérations Aériennes (CCOA), the air operations command and control centre where the overall air picture is generated and evaluated, is responsible for all air operations and for the security of the French airspace. This military authority is directly under the French President.

The CCOA, is located in an underground facility on Taverny Air Base (Base aérienne 921 ‘Frères Mahe’) near the town of Taverny. In radiotraffic it uses the tactical call sign (tactical) “Veilleur’

- The Centres de Détection et de Contrôle (CDC), the control & reporting centres are placed in the commandstructure of the Commandement Air des Systèmes de Surveillance, d’Information et de Communications (CASSIC) and are the subordinating units to the CDAOA.

There are 5 fully operational CDC's in the new ALA structure. These command & reporting centres are

- CDC 05.901 Drachenbronn located on Drachenbronn Air Base (Base aérienne 901 ‘Capitaine de Laubier') at the town of Birlenbach with the tactical “Riesling radar”.
- CDC 05.942 Lyon/Mont Verdun located on Lyon - Mont Verdun Air Base (Base aérienne 942 ‘Capitaine Robert’) at the city of Lyon with the tactical “Rambert radar”.
- CDC 05.943 Nice/Mont Agel located on Nice Air Base (Base aérienne 943 ‘Capitaine Auber’) at the town of Roquebrune-Cap Martin with the tactical “Rhodia radar”.
- CDC 04.930 Mont-de-Marsan located on Mont-de-Marsan Air Base (Base aérienne 118 ‘Colonel Rozanoff’) north of Mont-de-Marsan city with the tactical “Marina radar”.
- CDC 07.927 Cinq-Mars la Pile is an air detachment of Tours - Saint-Symphorien Air Base (Base aérienne 705 ‘Commandants Tulasne’) at Tours with the tactical “Raki radar”.

The former CDC 05.902 located on airbase 902 at Contrexéville and the former CDC located on air detachment 922 at Doullens have been deactivated and transformed into radiocommunications and satellite control stations. Although their infrastructure is still present and conserved the radar stations are not operational anymore.

- The Unité de détection aéroportée (UDA), the French airborne early warning (AWACS) unit located on airbase 702 ‘Cne Georges Madon’ near the town of Avord with the unit tactical "Cyrano". This airborne early warning unit, has been created in 1989 on the Avord airbase and consists of

36th Escadre de détection aéroportée (36 EDA), becoming operational in 1990 and equipped with 4 E-3F AWACS planes during 1990–1992.

Escadron de détection aéroportée (EDA 01.036) Berry and EDA 02.036 Nivernais are the 2 operational E-3F squadrons

Escadron de préparation des missions et simulation (ESMT 10.036) and Escadron de soutien technique spécialisé (ESTS 15.036), the mission supporting and the technical maintenance squadrons.

== See also ==
- Austrian air defense
- Swiss air defense
