= Centre de détection et de contrôle militaire =

The Centre de détection et de contrôle militaire (CDC) are the French military air traffic control regional centres, that would respond to a threat within French airspace.

== History ==
CDC Riesling, for the north-east of France, at Drachenbronn Air Base, closed on 17 July 2015, due to budget cuts in October 2014.

== Structure ==
There are currently three French CDC centres in operation. One closed in 2012, and another was made dormant in 2015 - its equipment is still there, but it is not in operation currently.

=== CDCs ===
- Cinq-Mars-la-Pile for north-west France
- Mont-de-Marsan Air Base (also home of two Rafale squadrons and CEAM, the French Air Force test centre) for south-west France
- Lyon – Mont Verdun Air Base for the South-East.

== See also ==
- Centre en route de la navigation aérienne (CRNA), the five regional civilian ATC centres across France, controlled by Direction des Services de la navigation aérienne (DSNA)
- NATO CRC centres
