= Fort de Giromagny =

Fort near Belfort, France

- Giromagny, France
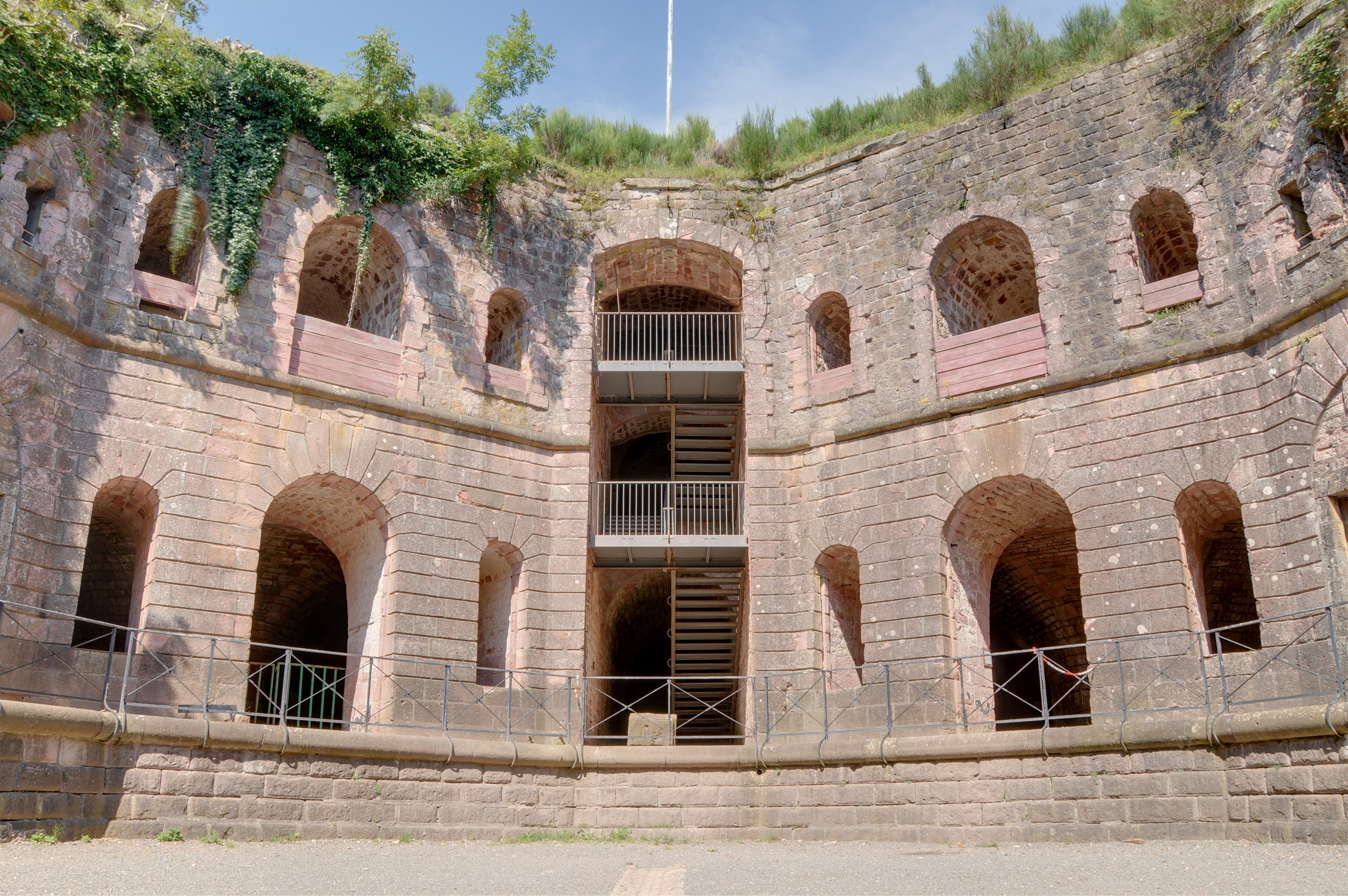
- Central court

Site information
- Type: Fort, Séré de Rivières system
- Controlled by: France
- Open to the public: Yes
- Condition: Preserved

Location
- Coordinates: 47.72709°N 6.81305°E

Site history
- Built: 1875
- Battles/wars: Battle of France

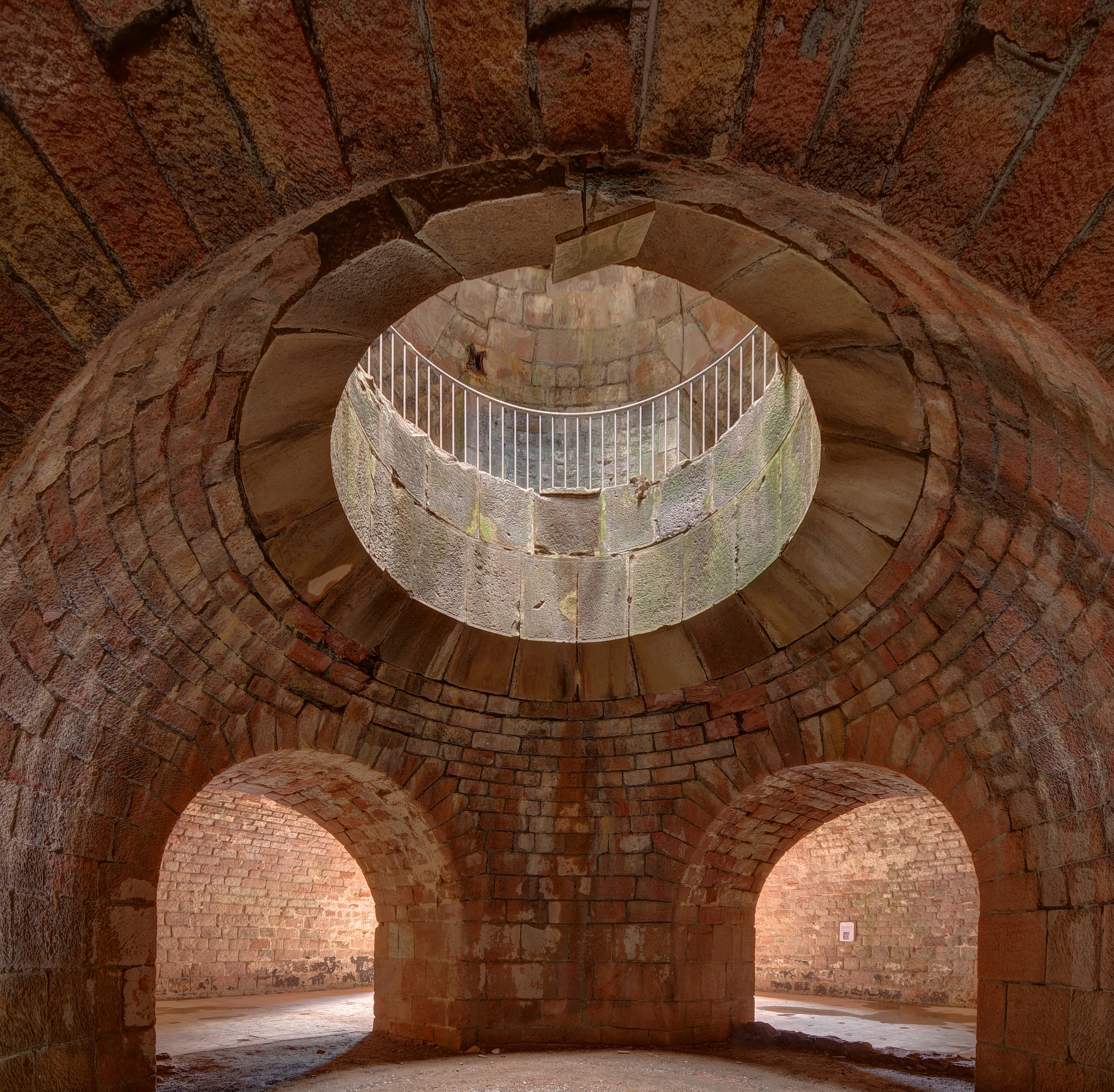
Fort de Giromagny interior

Fort de Giromagny, also known as Fort Dorsner, was built near Belfort in northeastern France between 1875 and 1879. The fort forms the southern end of the defensive curtain of the Haute Moselle Region, abutting the fortified region of Belfort, which lies to its south. The Haute Moselle defenses form a link between the fortified encampments of Épinal and Belfort. The fort overlooks the main roads to the northeast of Belfort, which form a crossroads at Giromagny.

The fort was built as part of France's Séré de Rivières system of fortifications to defend France against a recurrence of the Prussian invasion of the 1870-71 Franco-Prussian War. The fort was among the most strongly armed forts in the northeast in the late 19th and early 20th centuries. It received the first rotating armored turrets to be installed in a land fortification in France.

The fort's official name, Fort Dorsner, commemorates General Jean Philippe Raymond Dorsner, who fought in the French Revolutionary Wars and the Napoleonic Wars.

== Description ==
The trapezoidal fort is arranged to face to the north, its entry to the south. The pink sandstone walls enclose a court which contains a central block which in turn contained magazines and barracks, as well as two twin 155mm Mougin gun turrets, which constituted the fort's primary armament. It was originally furnished with a variety of guns on the ramparts, which were gradually reduced as the vulnerability of fixed gun emplacements in the open air became apparent. Six casemates were arranged for indirect fire, along with two satellite batteries. An optical signal post permitted communication with the Fort du Salbert to the south.

An 1890 modernization suppressed the casemates and replaced caponiers with counterscarps. Further modernizations saw the installation of electricity, three armored observation posts and detail improvements. More substantial changes, including the proposed installation of a 75mm gun turret were not carried out, but a shelter or abri-caverne for 100 soldiers was excavated. Portions of the fort were reinforced with concrete against shellfire during the First World War.

== History ==
In 1940 the fort was manned by the 7th Battery of the 159th Position Artillery Regiment (RAP), part of the fortified region of Belfort under the French 8th Army, Army Group 3. From 16 March 1940 the RF Belfort became the 44th Fortress Corps (CAF). During the Battle of France the Mougin turrets fired on German forces. After the armistice the Germans used Giromagny to make propaganda films purporting to show the capture of a Maginot Line fortification using flamethrowers on a turret before blowing it up with dynamite. The Germans reinforced the fort during the war, but blew up the entry on retreating in 1944.

Fort de Giromagny has been in the care of a preservation association since 1988. Visits may be arranged upon request.

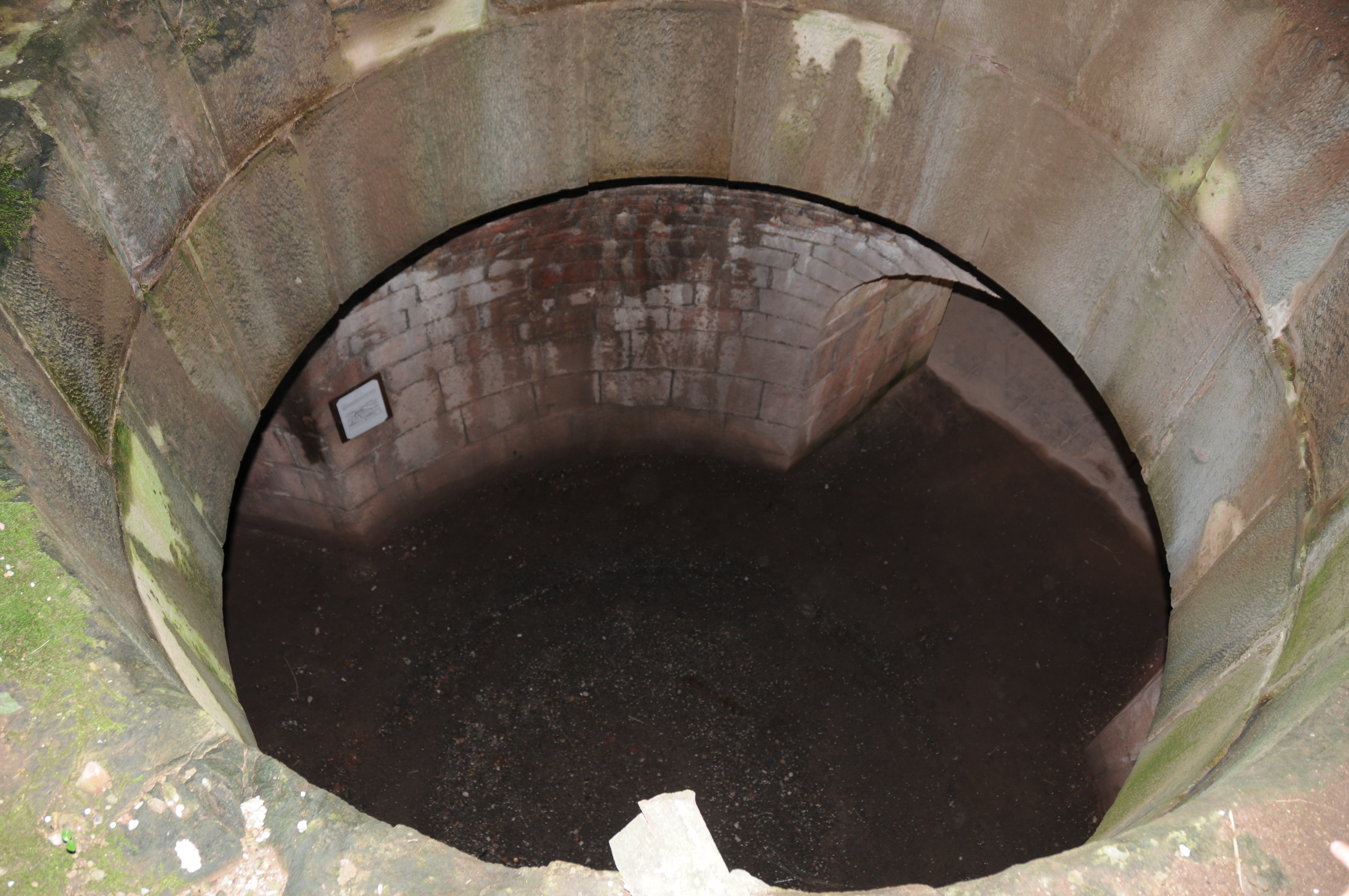
Hole for a Mougin gun turret

== See also ==
- Fortified region of Belfort
