= Ouvrage Hochwald =

Gros ouvrage of the Maginot Line

- Part of Maginot Line
- Northeast France
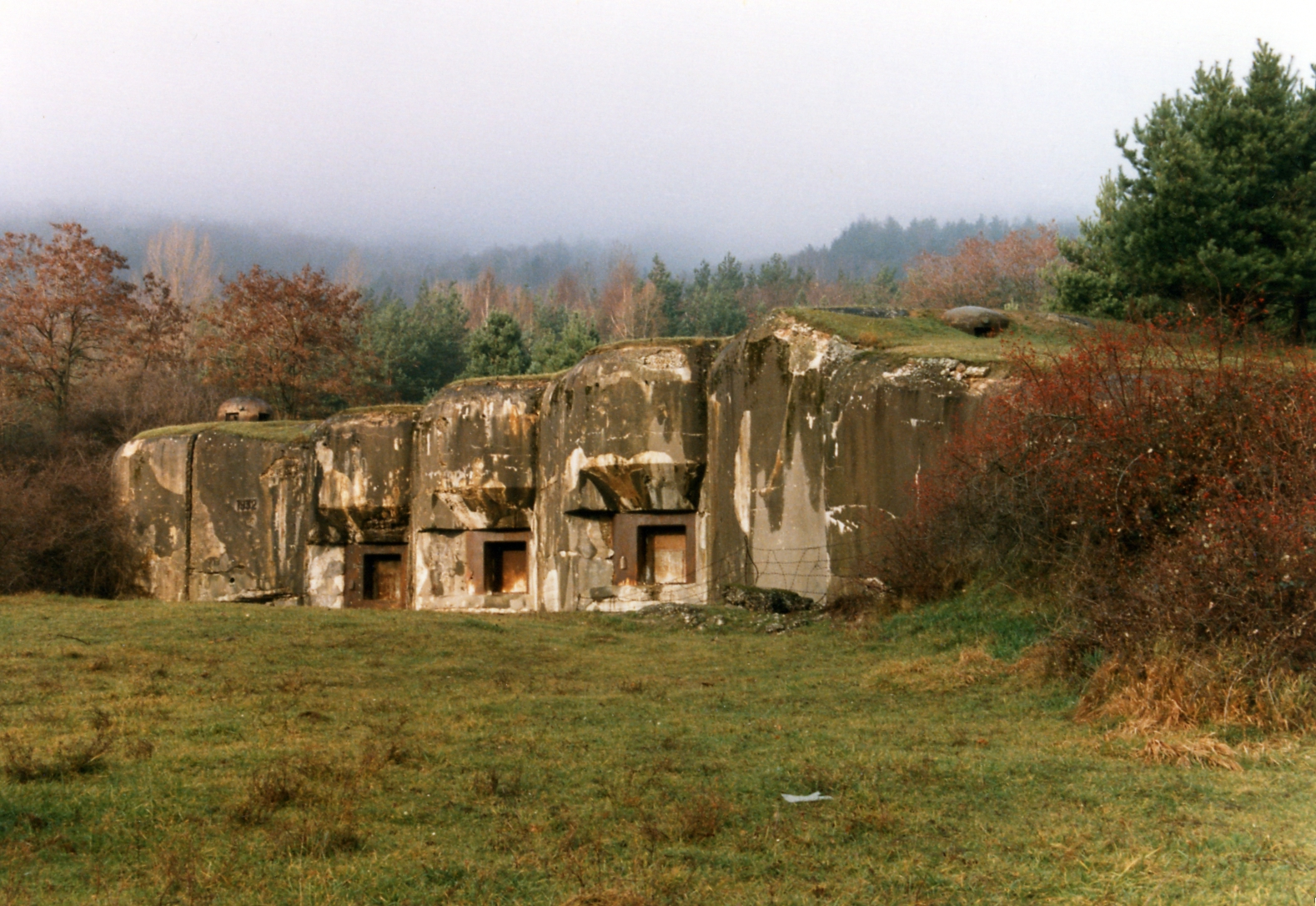
- Block 6

Site information
- Type: Gros Ouvrage
- Controlled by: France
- Open to the public: No
- Condition: In use by French Air Force

Location
- Position within France
- Location within France
- Coordinates: 48.9845°N 7.8337°E

Site history
- Built: 1929-1933
- Built by: CORF
- Materials: Concrete, steel, deep excavation
- Battles/wars: Battle of France, Lorraine Campaign

Garrison information
- Garrison: 1070

Ouvrage Hochwald is a gros ouvrage of the Maginot Line, one of the largest fortifications in the Line. Located on the Hochwald ridge in the Fortified Sector of Haguenau in the community of Drachenbronn-Birlenbach in the Bas-Rhin department of northeastern France, it was designed to protect the northern Vosges region of France. Ouvrage Hochwald is sometimes considered as two ouvrages because of its separation of the western and the eastern portions of the ouvrage. Uniquely, the original plans for the position included an elevated battery to the rear with long-range 145 mm or 155 mm gun turrets of a new kind. Hochwald is used by the French Air Force as an armoured air defense coordination center.

== Design and construction ==
The Hochwald site was surveyed by CORF (Commission d'Organisation des Régions Fortifiées), the Maginot Line's design and construction agency, in 1928. Work began the next year, and the position became operational in 1933. The gros ouvrage is unique in size and extent. The reduit at the peak of the Hochwald would have provided heavy, long-range artillery cover for the entire sector. (Note: English-language sources use the French term ouvrage as the preferred term for the Maginot positions, in preference to "fort", a term usually reserved for older fortifications with passive defences in the form of walls and ditches. The literal translation of ouvrage in the sense of a fortification in English is "work." A gros ouvrage is a large fortification with a significant artillery component, while a petit ouvrage is smaller, with lighter arms.)

== Description ==
Hochwald is flanked on the west by Ouvrage Four-à-Chaux and on the east by Ouvrage Schoenenbourg, comprising one of the strongest points on the Line. The height of the Hochwald ridge overlooks the area of Wissembourg to the east, which forms a gap between the hills of the northern Vosges and the Palatinate Forest on the west and the Bienwald on the east. The landscape on the French side of the border is an open farmed plain for 24 kilometres (15 mi) eastwards to the Rhine. The ouvrage formed part of the "principal line of resistance", an element of defense in depth that was preceded by a line of advance posts close to the border and backed by a line of shelters for infantry. Hochwald's fighting elements were placed in the line of resistance, with the entrances and their associated supply lines protected by infantry in the third line, 1-kilometre (0.62 mi) or more to the rear. The entrances were served by narrow-gauge 60-centimetre (24 in) railways, that branched from a line paralleling the front and connecting to supply depots. The rail lines ran directly into the munitions entry of the ouvrage and all the way out to the combat blocks, a distance of nearly 2,000 metres (6,600 ft).

Ouvrage Hochwald includes ten combat blocks and three entrance blocks: five combat blocks located on each side of the Hochwald massif, an ammunition entrance, a personnel entrance located on the back (south) side and an intermediate personnel entrance located in the middle of the principal gallery. Hochwald was equipped in 1940 with the following armament:

=== Eastern wing (O 720) ===
- Block 1: Artillery block with one 135mm gun turret, one 135mm gun embrasure, one automatic rifle cloche (GFM) and one observation cloche (VDP).
- Block 2: A submerged (in the earth) block with one 81mm mortar turret, one GFM cloche and one machine gun cloche (JM).
- Block 3: A casemate block with two 75mm gun embrasures, two machine gun/47 mm anti-tank gun embrasures (JM/AC47), two GFM cloches and two 50 mm grenade launcher embrasures.
- Block 4: unbuilt.
- Block 5: A submerged block with one machine gun turret.
- Block 6: A casemate with three 75mm gun embrasures, one grenade launcher cloche (LG), one GFM cloche and one JM cloche.
- Block 7: East entry block with two GFM cloches and two machine gun/47mm anti-tank gun embrasures (JM/AC47). A shaft connects to the galleries below and the eastern underground barracks.
- Block 7 bis: Submerged block with one 75mm gun turret and one GFM cloche.

=== Western wing (O 703) ===
- Block 12: A casemate block with two 75mm gun embrasures, one GFM cloche and one VDP cloche.
- Block 13: A casemate block with one 135mm gun embrasure, one JM/AC47 embrasure, one JM embrasure, one LG cloche and two GFM cloches
- Block 14: A submerged block with one 135mm gun turret, one GFM cloche and one VDP cloche.
- Block 15: A submerged block with one machine gun turret and one GFM cloche.
- Block 16: A casemate block with two 75mm embrasures, two JM/AC47 embrasures, two 50mm mortar embrasures and two GFM cloches.

=== Anti-tank ditch and casemates ===
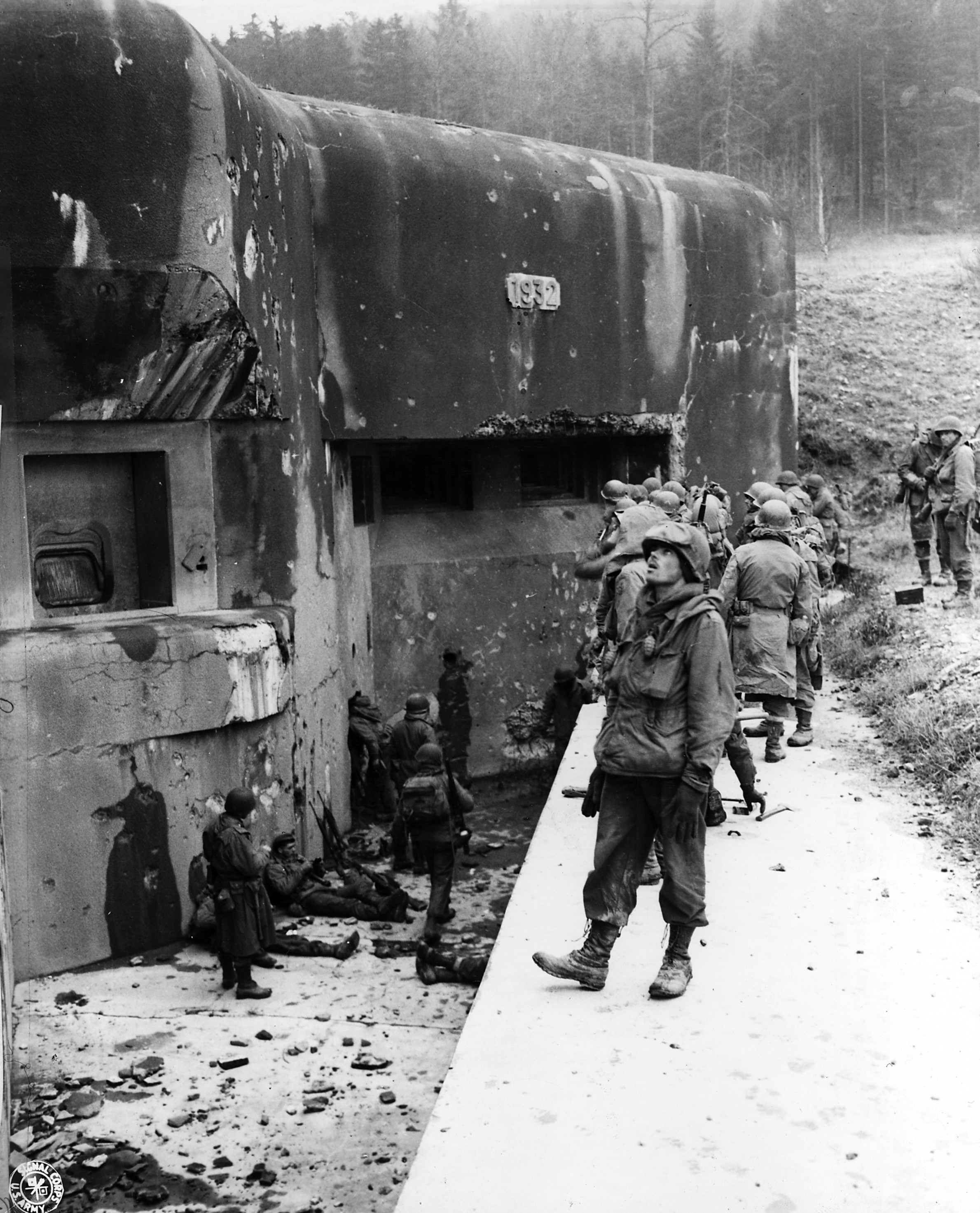
American soldiers at Hochwald West, Block 13 in 1944

A chevroned ditch runs over the ridge between the east and west wings with a series of casemates located to sweep the ditch with fire. The casemates are not connected to each other or to the ouvrage.

- Casemate 1: Single-sided, firing to the west with one JM embrasure, one JM/AC47 embrasure and one GFM cloche.
- Casemate 2: Single-sided, firing to the west with two JM embrasures, one mortar cloche and one GFM cloche.
- Casemate 3: Single-sided, firing to the west with four JM embrasures and one GFM cloche.
- Casemate 4: Double-sided, firing east and west with four JM embrasures on two levels, two mortar cloches and one GFM cloche.
- Casemate 5: Single-sided, firing to the east with two JM embrasures, one mortar cloche and one GFM cloche.
- Casemate 6: Single-sided, firing to the east with four JM embrasures on two levels and one GFM cloche.
- Casemate 7: Single-sided, firing to the east with two JM embrasures, one mortar cloche and one GFM cloche.
- Casemate 8: Single-sided, firing to the east with two JM embrasures and two GFM cloches.
- Casemate 9: Single-sided, firing to the east with one JM embrasure, one JM/AC47 embrasure, one mortar cloche and one GFM cloche.

=== Entries, observation post and réduit ===
- Block 8: A munitions entry for the west wing with two JM/AC47 embrasures and two GFM cloches. The entry connects at the level of the gallery system.
- Block 9: A personnel entry for the west wing with one JM/AC47 embrasure, one LG cloche and one GFM cloche. The entry reaches the galleries below by a shaft.

The planned réduit for long-range 145mm or 155mm guns was never built. Its entry was partially completed and never armed. Partially completed galleries run some hundreds of meters into the hill from the rear to the location of the planned combat blocks at the crest of the ridge.

Entry blocks 8 and 9 serve the main ammunition magazine, utility area (usine) and underground barracks. They are more than a kilometer from the west wing combat blocks and close to two kilometers from the east wing blocks, at a depth underground of approximately 30 metres (98 ft). The western underground barracks and the large "M1"-type magazine are just inside the entries. These areas were converted and expanded to form the basis of Base Aérienne 901 Drachenbronn in a manner similar to the adaptation of Ouvrage Rochonvillers for the NATO CENTAG headquarters of the 1960s.

Block 20 is an isolated and unconnected observation block on the summit of the Hochwald with a VP cloche and a GFM cloche.

The generating plant was split into two units: the west generating plant comprised four Sulzer engines of 240 hp each, and the east four Sulzer engines of 165 hp each.

=== Casemates and shelters ===
A series of detached casemates and infantry shelters are in the vicinity of Hochwald, including

- Abri de Walkmühl: Subsurface abri-caverne (Note: An abri is an infantry shelter, sometimes underground or under earth cover. An abri in the main Maginot Line often closely resembles a casemate, but is more lightly armed and can hold more occupants.) for two infantry sections, with two GFM cloches.
- Abri de Birlenbach: Sub-surface abri-caverne for two infantry sections with two GFM cloches.
- Casemate de Drachenbronn Nord: SIngle block with one JM/AC37 embrasure, one twin machine gun embrasure and a GFM cloche.
- Casemate de Drachenbronn Sud: SIngle block with one JM/AC37 embrasure, one twin machine gun embrasure and a GFM cloche. Drachenbronn Nord and Sud are linked by an underground gallery.

=== Ouvrage Bremmelbach ===
Two casemates to the east of Hochwald comprise the remainder of the planned petit ouvrage Bremmelbach, canceled in 1929.

- Casemate Bremmelbach Nord: Double casemate with two JM/AC47 embrasures, two JM embrasures and one GFM cloche.
- Casemate Bremmelbach Sud: Single casemate with one JM/Ac37 embrasure, one JM embrasure and one GFM cloche.

The two casemates are linked by an underground gallery.

== Manning ==
The 1940 manning of the ouvrage under the command of Lieutenant Colonel Miconnet comprised 1022 men and 41 officers of the 22nd Fortress Infantry Regiment and the 156th Position Artillery Regiment. The units were under the umbrella of the 5th Army, Army Group 2. Interval troops covering the areas between and outside the fortifications were assigned to the 16th and 70th Infantry Divisions, 12th Corps. The nearby Casernement de Drachenbronn provided peacetime above-ground barracks and support services to Hochwald and other positions in the area.

== History ==
See Fortified Sector of Haguenau for a broader discussion of the Haguenau sector of the Maginot Line.

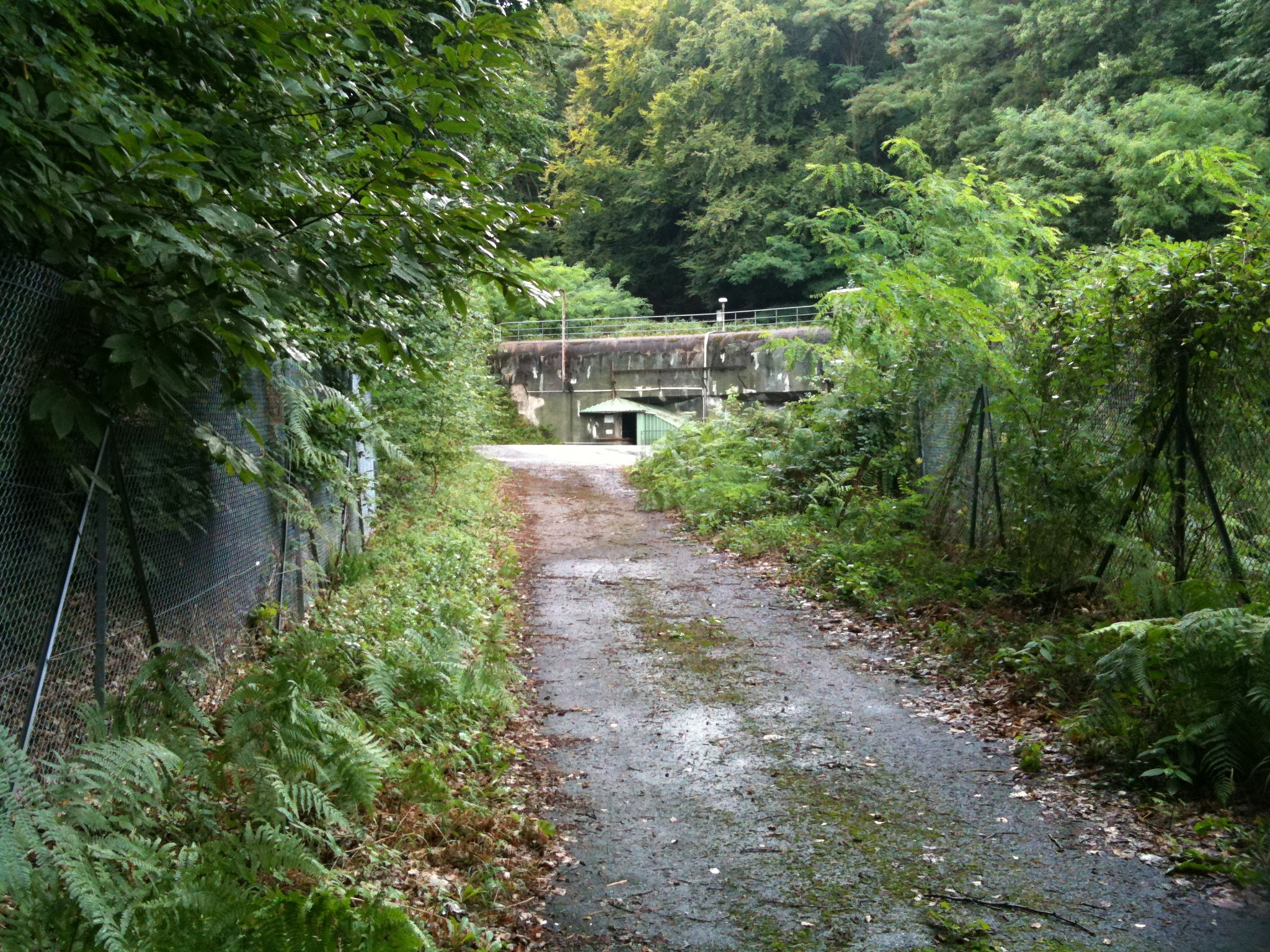
Hochwald Block 9

Hochwald was one of the most active ouvrages during the Phoney War of 1939–1940. On 8–9 October 1939, Hochwald fired in support of French patrols, revealing deficiencies in gun mounts and ammunition. In November the ouvrage fired on German minelayers. During the Battle of France in June 1940, Hochwald remained unmolested until 16 June, when it fired on Germans moving toward Lembach and received artillery fire and Stuka attacks in return. Attacks came again on the 20th, and Hochwald fired in support of Lembach. More aerial attacks followed on the 22nd.

In 1944, the retreating Germans blew up blocks 1, 3 6 and 16, and all three entrance blocks, as well as all turrets. In 1944 Hochwald (renamed Werk Hochwald) was used as an underground factory.

With the formation of NATO, French interest in a renewed fortification system against a Warsaw Pact invasion caused the renovation of most of the larger Maginot fortifications by the 1950s. Hochwald joined Schoenenbourg, Four-à-Chaux and Lembach in a system called the Môle de Haguenau, with work at Hochwald proceeding in 1952 to repair the war damage. However, in 1956, Hochwald was transferred to the French Air Force for use as an air defense command center. New underground galleries were built in the rear (i.e., near the entrance blocks), and were even provided with an internal machine gun port. The facility was briefly known as Ouvrage H before its designation as Base Aérienne 901 Drachenbronn.

== Current condition ==
Hochwald is part of the French Air Force's Drachenbronn Air Base, and is used as a hardened command center. It is closed to the public except for the Pierre Jost Museum, which is open on days of national remembrance. In 2015 the military base was closed, only the radar antennas are still in use and are remotely controlled. Another Maginot ouvrage, Mont Agel of the Alpine Line, performs a similar function in southeastern France.

== See also ==
- List of all works on Maginot Line
- Siegfried Line
- Atlantic Wall
- Czechoslovak border fortifications

== Bibliography ==
- Allcorn, William. The Maginot Line 1928-45. Oxford: Osprey Publishing, 2003. ISBN 1-84176-646-1
- Kaufmann, J.E. and Kaufmann, H.W. Fortress France: The Maginot Line and French Defenses in World War II, Stackpole Books, 2006. ISBN 0-275-98345-5
- Kaufmann, J.E., Kaufmann, H.W., Jancovič-Potočnik, A. and Lang, P. The Maginot Line: History and Guide, Pen and Sword, 2011. ISBN 978-1-84884-068-3
- Mary, Jean-Yves; Hohnadel, Alain; Sicard, Jacques. Hommes et Ouvrages de la Ligne Maginot, Tome 1. Paris, Histoire & Collections, 2001. ISBN 2-908182-88-2 (in French)
- Mary, Jean-Yves; Hohnadel, Alain; Sicard, Jacques. Hommes et Ouvrages de la Ligne Maginot, Tome 2. Paris, Histoire & Collections, 2003. ISBN 2-908182-97-1 (in French)
- Mary, Jean-Yves; Hohnadel, Alain; Sicard, Jacques. Hommes et Ouvrages de la Ligne Maginot, Tome 3. Paris, Histoire & Collections, 2003. ISBN 2-913903-88-6 (in French)
- Mary, Jean-Yves; Hohnadel, Alain; Sicard, Jacques. Hommes et Ouvrages de la Ligne Maginot, Tome 5. Paris, Histoire & Collections, 2009. ISBN 978-2-35250-127-5 (in French)
