= Giromagny =

- Commune
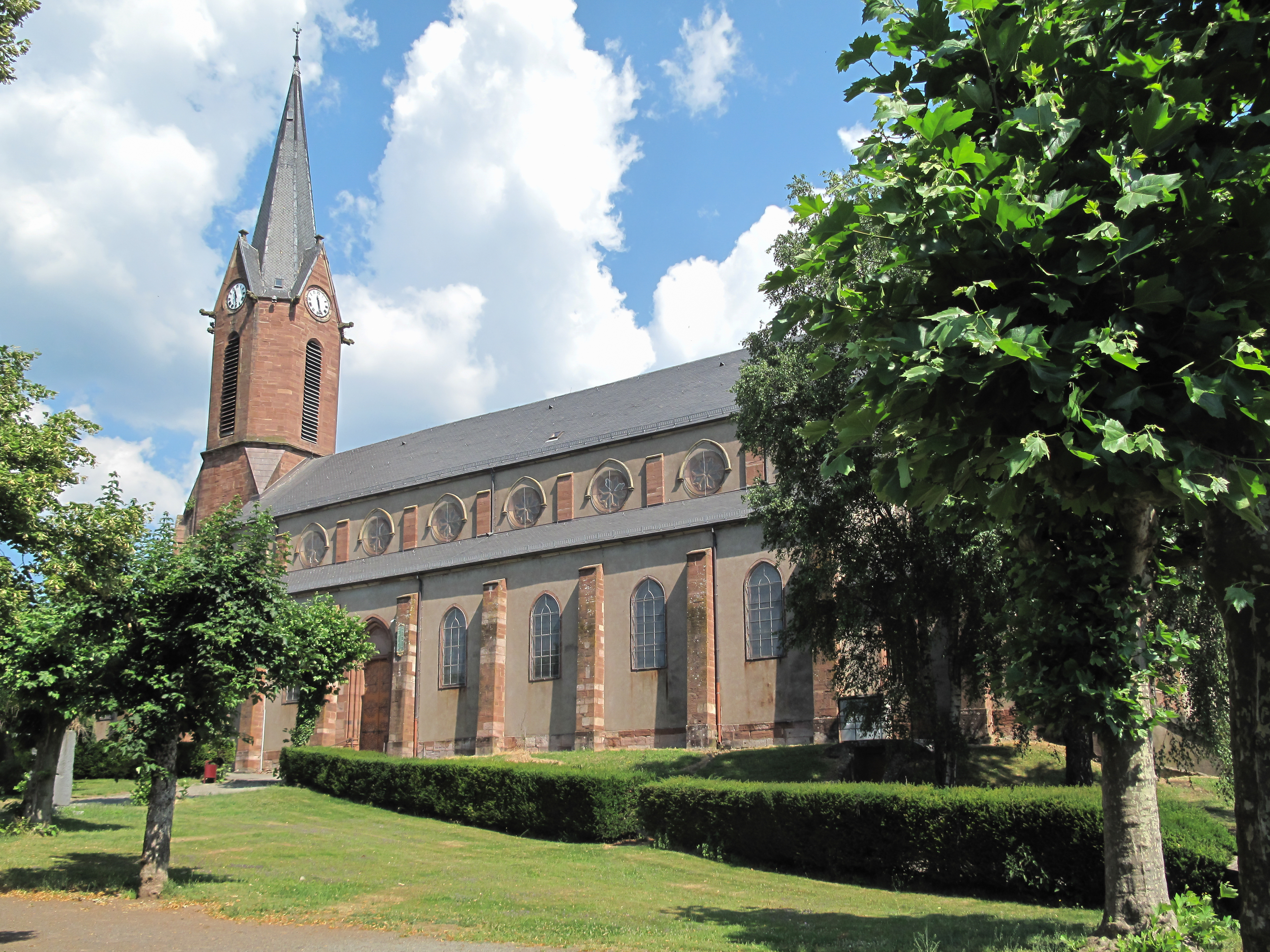
- Saint-Jean-Baptiste church

- Coat of arms
- Location of Giromagny
- Location within France Location within Bourgogne-Franche-Comté
- Coordinates: 47°44′33″N 6°49′35″E
- Country: France
- Region: Bourgogne-Franche-Comté
- Department: Territoire de Belfort
- Arrondissement: Belfort
- Canton: Giromagny
- Intercommunality: Vosges du Sud

Government
  - Mayor (2020–2026): Christian Coddet
- Area^{1}: 5.65 km^{2} (2.18 sq mi)
- Highest elevation: 800 m (2,600 ft)
- Lowest elevation: 452 m (1,483 ft)
- Population (2023): 2,907
  - Density: 515/km^{2} (1,330/sq mi)
- Time zone: UTC+01:00 (CET)
  - Summer (DST): UTC+02:00 (CEST)
- INSEE/Postal code: 90052 /90200
- ^{1} French Land Register data, which excludes lakes, ponds, glaciers > 1 km^{2} (0.386 sq mi or 247 acres) and river estuaries.

Giromagny (French pronunciation: [ʒiʁɔmaɲi]) is a commune in the Territoire de Belfort department in Bourgogne-Franche-Comté in northeastern France.

== Geography ==
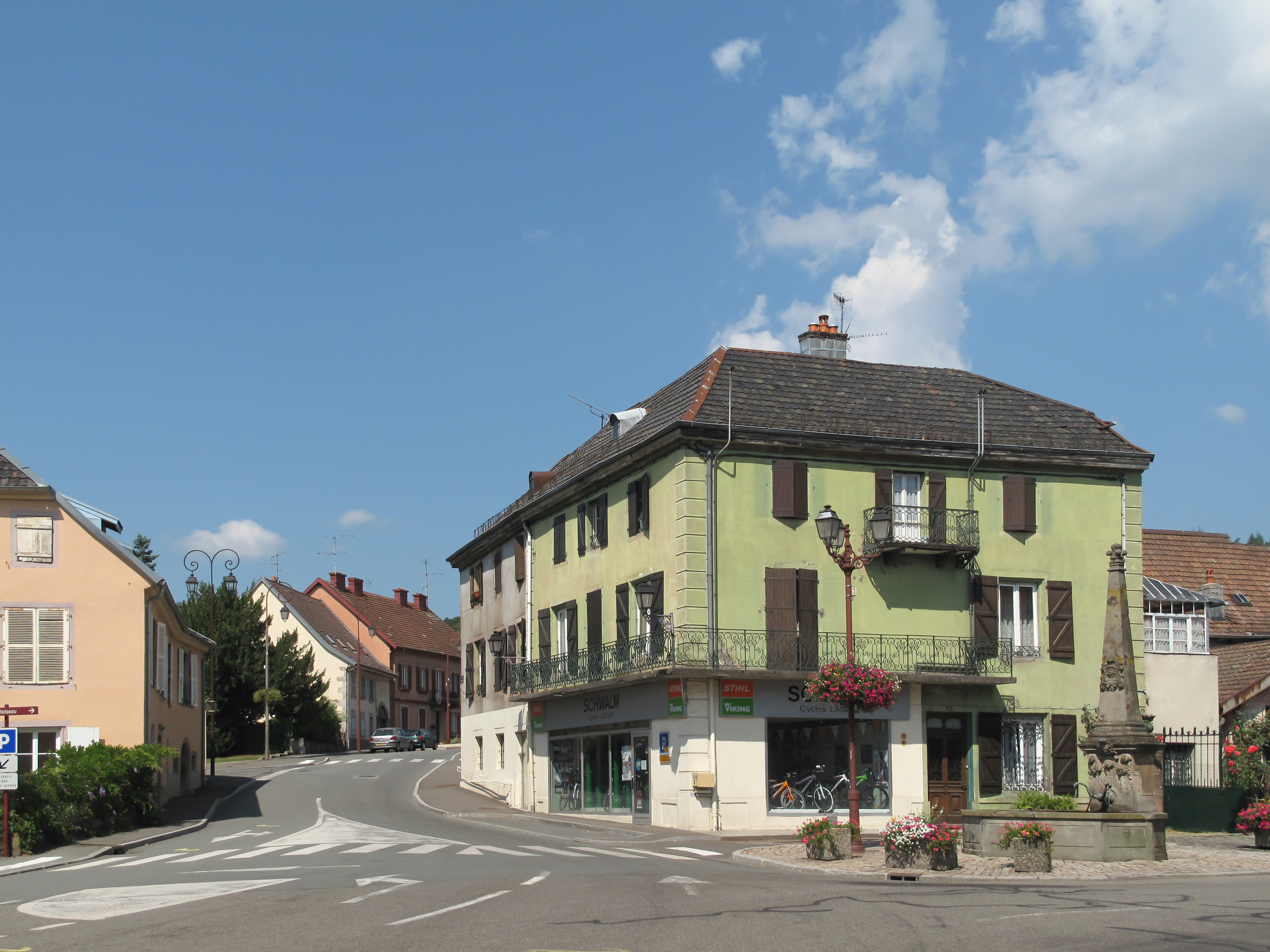
Memorial of the union of Alsace to France in 1648

=== Climate ===
Giromagny has an oceanic climate (Köppen climate classification Cfb). The average annual temperature in Giromagny is 10.2 °C (50.4 °F). The average annual rainfall is 1,636.6 mm (64.43 in) with December as the wettest month. The temperatures are highest on average in July, at around 19.1 °C (66.4 °F), and lowest in January, at around 1.7 °C (35.1 °F). The highest temperature ever recorded in Giromagny was 37.2 °C (99.0 °F) on 24 July 2019; the coldest temperature ever recorded was −18.9 °C (−2.0 °F) on 20 December 2009.

Climate data for Giromagny (1991–2020 averages, extremes 1991−present)
Month	Jan	Feb	Mar	Apr	May	Jun	Jul	Aug	Sep	Oct	Nov	Dec	Year
Record high °C (°F)	17.2 (63.0)	20.7 (69.3)	24.9 (76.8)	27.8 (82.0)	32.0 (89.6)	35.0 (95.0)	37.2 (99.0)	36.8 (98.2)	31.4 (88.5)	27.4 (81.3)	21.8 (71.2)	16.8 (62.2)	37.2 (99.0)
Mean daily maximum °C (°F)	4.7 (40.5)	6.1 (43.0)	10.5 (50.9)	14.7 (58.5)	18.6 (65.5)	22.4 (72.3)	24.3 (75.7)	24.1 (75.4)	19.6 (67.3)	14.7 (58.5)	8.8 (47.8)	5.5 (41.9)	14.5 (58.1)
Daily mean °C (°F)	1.7 (35.1)	2.5 (36.5)	6.1 (43.0)	9.7 (49.5)	13.6 (56.5)	17.2 (63.0)	19.1 (66.4)	18.9 (66.0)	14.8 (58.6)	10.7 (51.3)	5.6 (42.1)	2.6 (36.7)	10.2 (50.4)
Mean daily minimum °C (°F)	−1.3 (29.7)	−1.1 (30.0)	1.7 (35.1)	4.7 (40.5)	8.7 (47.7)	12.0 (53.6)	13.8 (56.8)	13.6 (56.5)	10.1 (50.2)	6.6 (43.9)	2.4 (36.3)	−0.3 (31.5)	5.9 (42.6)
Record low °C (°F)	−14.5 (5.9)	−17.0 (1.4)	−14.7 (5.5)	−4.5 (23.9)	−1.3 (29.7)	2.1 (35.8)	4.9 (40.8)	4.6 (40.3)	1.0 (33.8)	−6.0 (21.2)	−11.0 (12.2)	−18.9 (−2.0)	−18.9 (−2.0)
Average precipitation mm (inches)	185.1 (7.29)	143.5 (5.65)	147.3 (5.80)	90.1 (3.55)	127.6 (5.02)	104.1 (4.10)	104.9 (4.13)	106.0 (4.17)	108.9 (4.29)	143.2 (5.64)	161.4 (6.35)	214.5 (8.44)	1,636.6 (64.43)
Average precipitation days (≥ 1.0 mm)	13.3	11.8	11.7	10.8	13.9	11.3	10.6	11.2	10.2	12.5	13.2	14.9	145.5
Source: Météo-France

== Population ==
Historical population
Year	Pop.	±% p.a.
1968	3,171	—
1975	3,393	+0.97%
1982	3,577	+0.76%
1990	3,226	−1.28%
1999	3,300	+0.25%
2007	3,259	−0.16%
2012	3,141	−0.73%
2017	3,064	−0.50%
2023	2,907	−0.87%
Source: INSEE

== See also ==
- Communes of the Territoire de Belfort department
- Fort de Giromagny
