= Hochwald (Alsace) =

Coordinates: 8°59′05″N 7°49′52″E

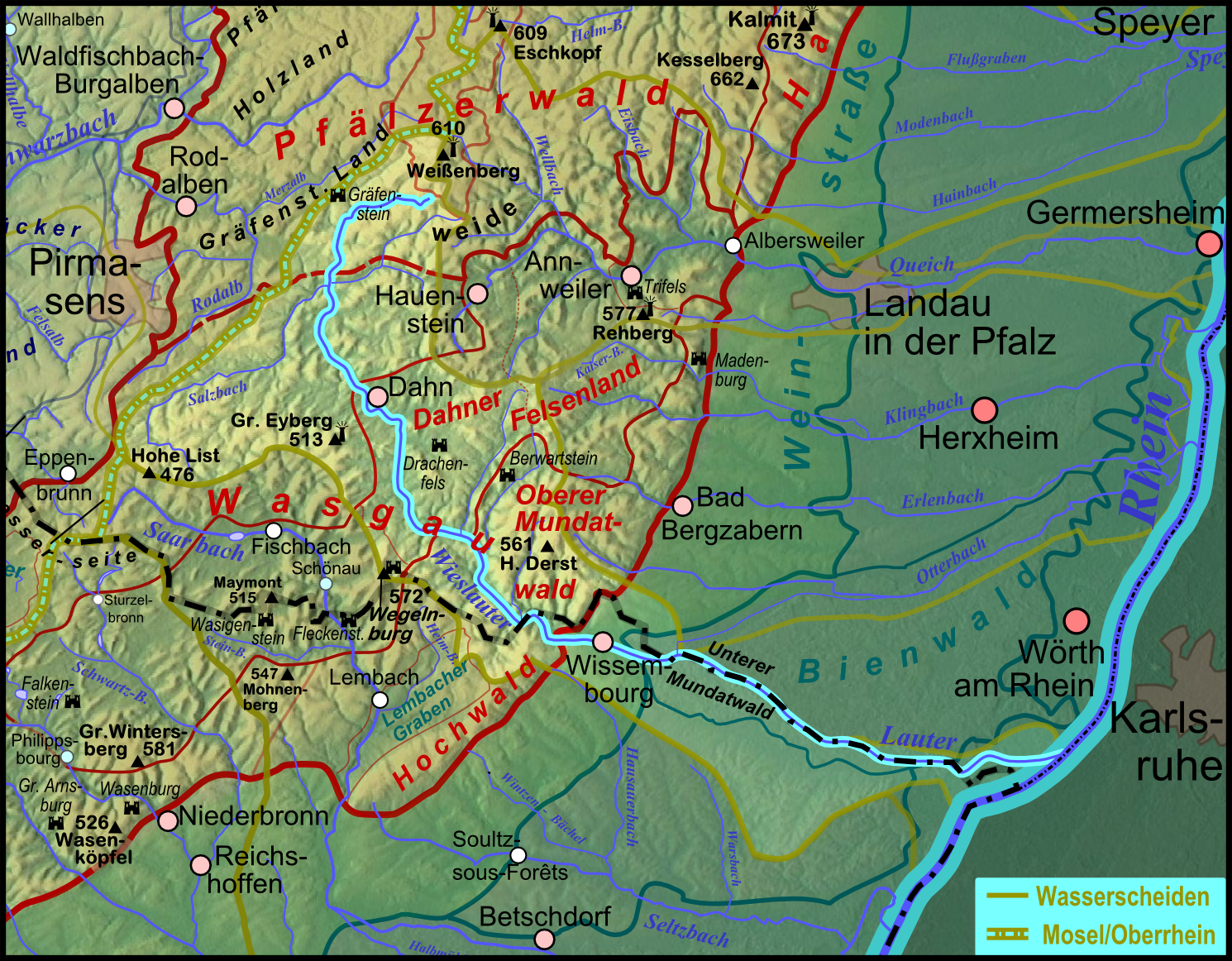
The Hochwald, southwest of Wissembourg

The Hochwald is a hill ridge, up to 508 metres high, in the North Vosges in the French département of Bas-Rhin near Wissembourg (German: Weißenburg). Topographically it represents the northernmost part of the Vosges mountains. To the north is the valley of the Lauter, which is both the border between France and Germany (state of Rhineland-Palatinate) and also the boundary between the (North) Vosges and the Palatine Forest (specifically the Mundat Forest).

== See also ==
- Ouvrage Hochwald
