= Egypt Carrying the Light to Asia =

Historical plan

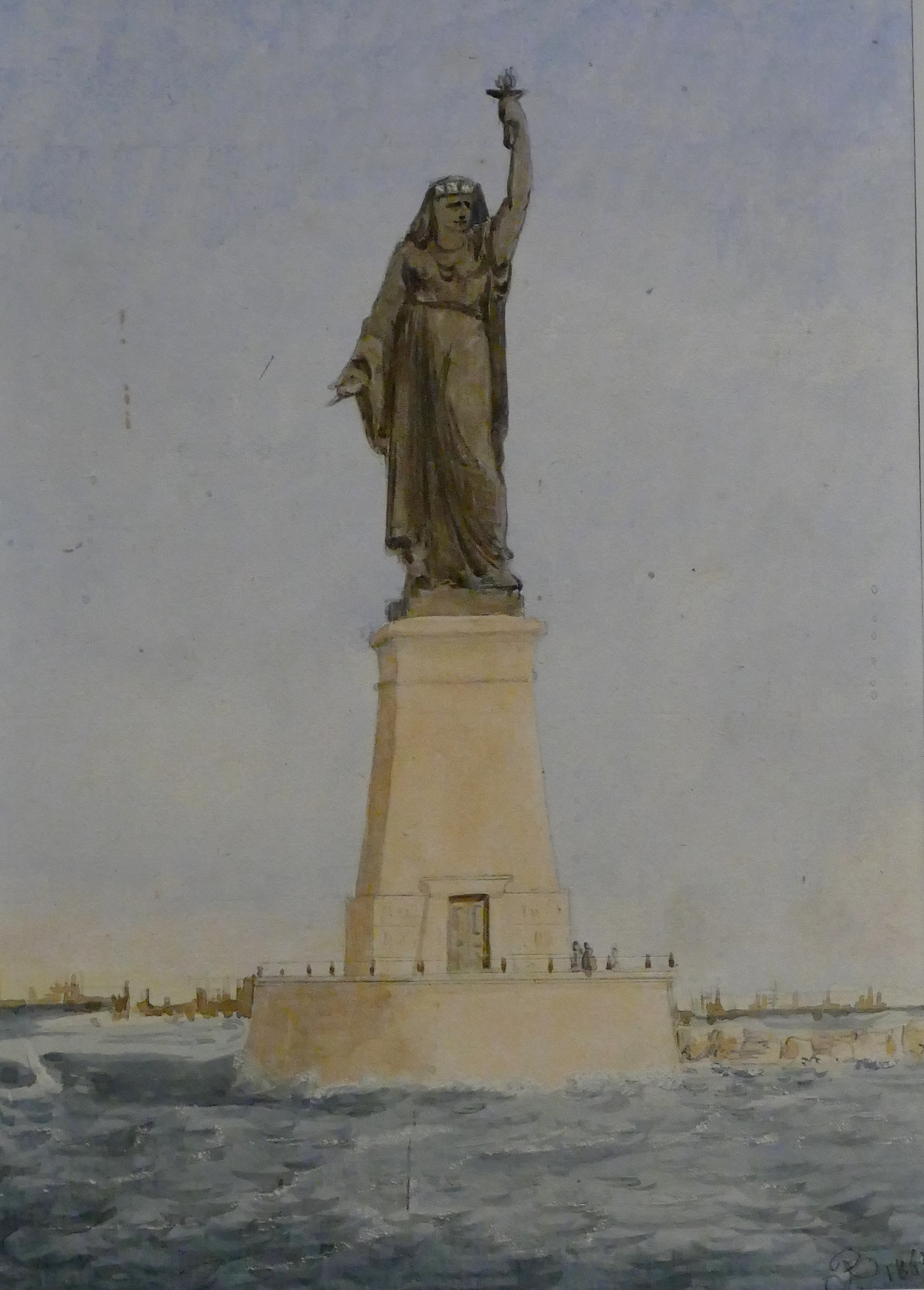
Bartholdi's conceptual rendering for Egypt Carrying the Light to Asia. Watercolor.

Egypt Carrying the Light to Asia, also known as Progress Carrying the Light to Asia, was a plan for a colossal neoclassical sculpture. Designed in the late 1860s by French sculptor Frédéric Auguste Bartholdi, the project was to be a statue of a robed female Saeid Misr or "Upper Egyptian" bearing a torch at the entryway of the Suez Canal in Port Said, Egypt. The statue was to stand 86 feet (26 m) high and its pedestal was to rise to a height of 48 feet (15 m). The proposed statue was declined by the Khedive, citing the expensive cost, and in 1869 the Port Said Lighthouse, designed by François Coignet, was built in the same location.

The idea for a statue on the mouth of the Suez was inspired by Bartholdi's encounter with ancient Egyptian giant statuary at Abu Simbel. Bartholdi further researched the ancient Colossus of Rhodes (one of the Seven Wonders of the Ancient World, which was a 33-metre-tall (108 ft) statue of the Greek god Helios at the entrance to the island's main port) and came up with the design of the female fellah, which later in the process evolved into that of a classical goddess.

After the failure of the Egyptian project, Bartholdi recycled his design as Liberty Enlightening the World, better known as the Statue of Liberty, which was installed in the New York Harbor in 1886.
