= Port Said Lighthouse =

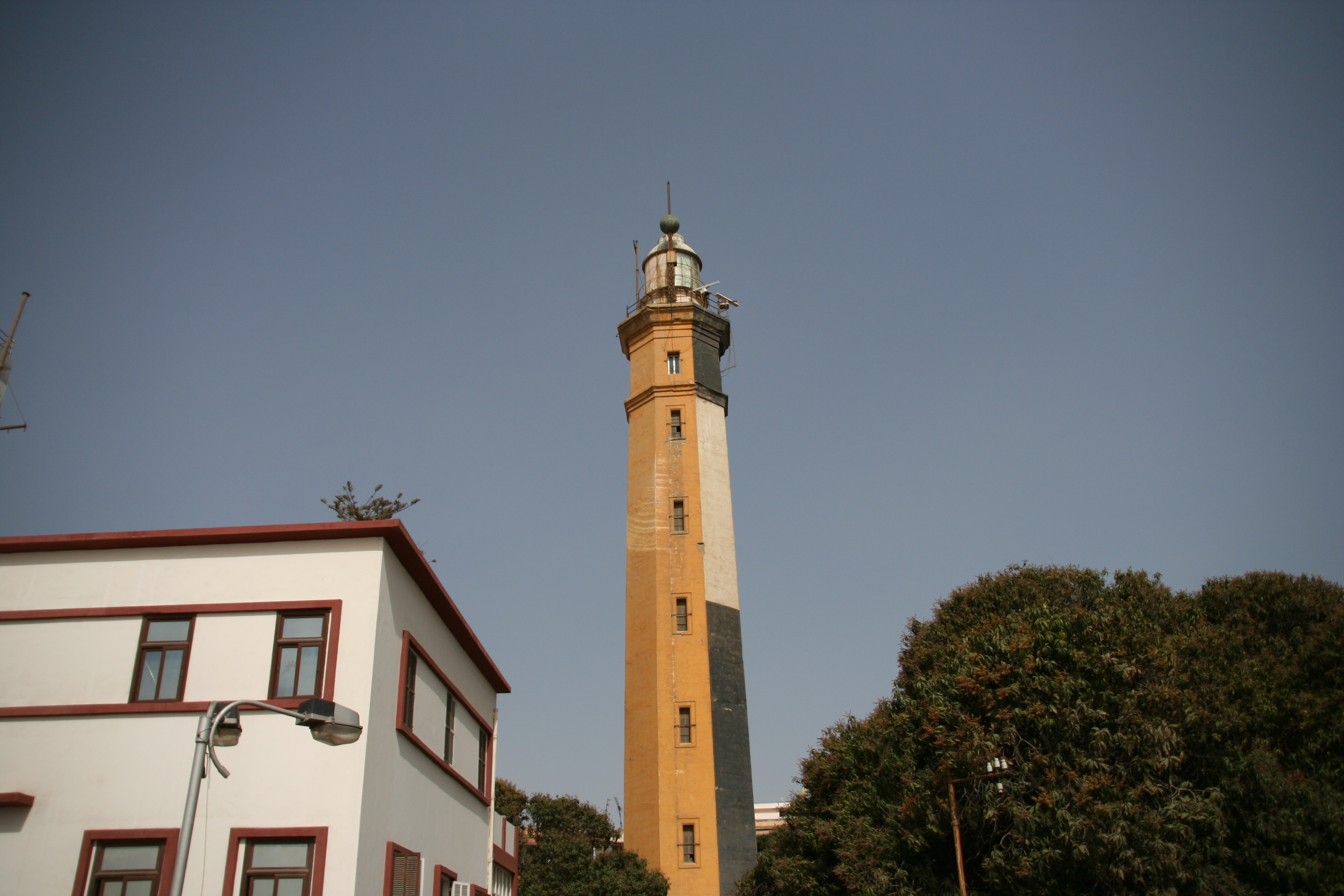
- The lighthouse in 2008
- Location: East district, Port Said, Egypt
- Coordinates: 31°15′50″N 32°18′42″E

Tower
- Constructed: c. 1869
- Foundation: Reinforced concrete
- Construction: Masonry
- Height: 56 m (184 ft)
- Shape: Octagonal prism tower with balcony and lantern
- Markings: unpainted tower except the seaward side painted white and black

Light
- First lit: 1869
- Deactivated: 1997 (?)
- Focal height: 59 m (194 ft)
- Range: 40 km (25 mi)

Port Said Lighthouse (Arabic: فنار بورسعيد القديم) is one of the most important architectural and tourist landmarks in the city of Port Said in Egypt. Considered a unique example for the evolution of architecture during the nineteenth century in the city, the lighthouse was designed by François Coignet at the request of the Khedive of Egypt and Sudan, Ismail the Magnificent.

Construction was completed in 1869, one week prior to the inauguration of the Suez Canal. The lighthouse was built to guide ships passing through the canal. The lighthouse has an octagonal shaped tower that is 56 metres (184 ft) high.

== History ==
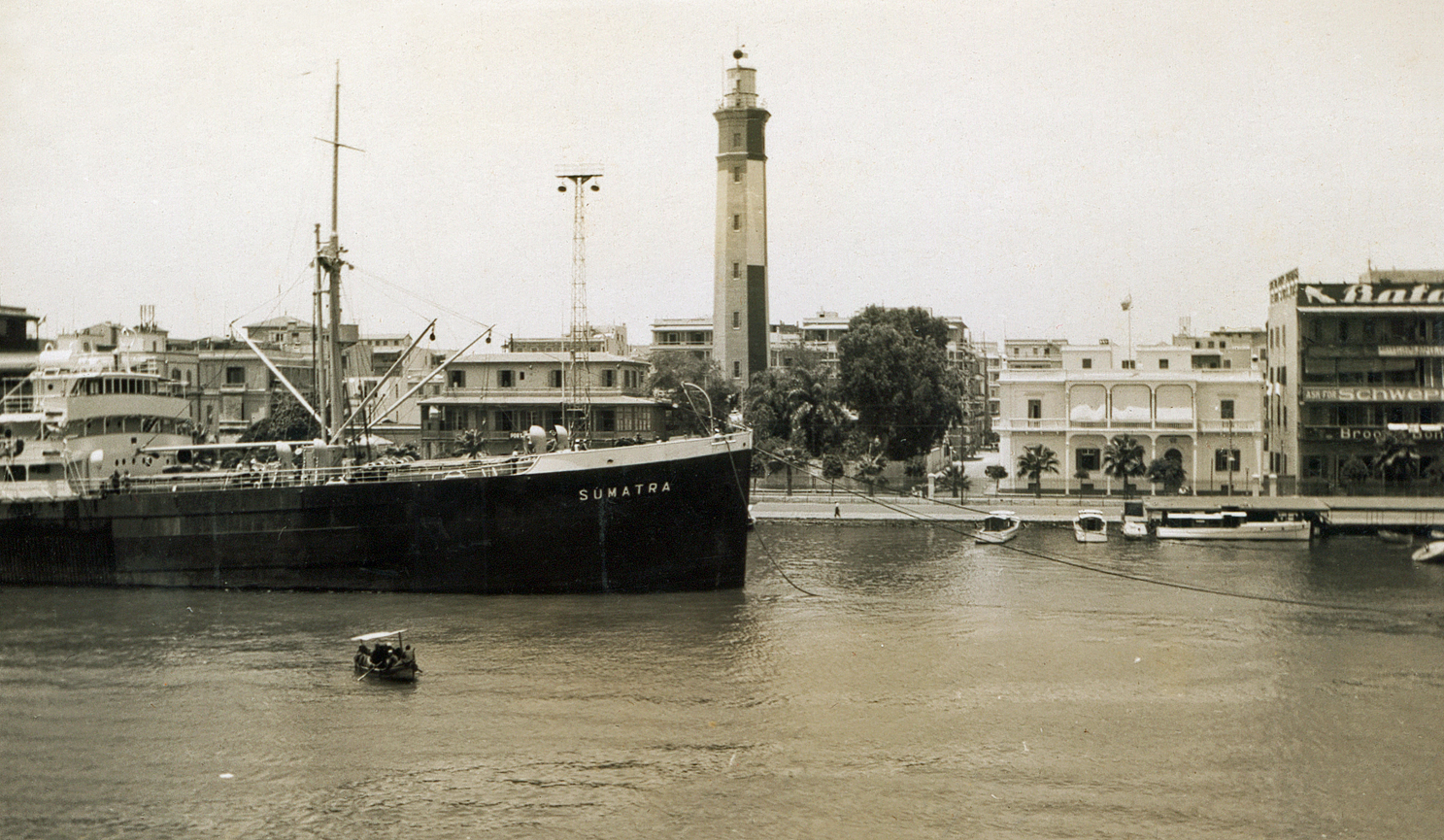
The lighthouse of Port Said in the 1930s

From 1868 until the end of his reign, Khedive Ismail ordered the construction of lighthouses at different points across Egypt's Mediterranean coast. Among these, the lighthouse of Port Said had special significance owing to its connection to the Suez Canal, the national infrastructure project undertaken during Ismail's reign. Ismail commissioned French industrialist and engineer François Coignet to design the lighthouse and oversee its construction. The lack of nearby stone quarries and the cost of importing stone from elsewhere led those in charge to become interested in concrete as a material. Coignet determined to use the novel technique of reinforced concrete in the construction.

The lighthouse was constructed by layering liquid concrete 20 to 25 cm (7.9 to 9.8 inches) in thickness. To ensure the structural cohesion of the whole, iron wall ties were inserted. The application of concrete was doubly innovative: employed as a finish material, not merely a substance for filling masonry walls; and strengthened with the inset metal rods. Coignet employed this new technique he had experimented with several years earlier in the construction of his own home, resulting in the first large-scale reinforced concrete structure. The use of an electric arc lamp made it possible to display a consistent flashing light, and it was overall a state-of-the-art lighthouse at the time.

Nothing of the original Port Said infrastructure remains except for the lighthouse. The buildup of silt along the coast of the port has left the lighthouse inland, where it can no longer serve its original purpose of guiding ships. In 2010, intellectuals called for it to be turned into a museum of maritime transport. In January 2011, the Port Said lighthouse was officially registered as a national monument in Egypt.

== See also ==
- "Egypt Carrying the Light to Asia" statue proposal for Port Said, 1869
- List of lighthouses in Egypt
