= Bourbaki Panorama =

Panoramic painting by Édouard Castres and his team

The Bourbaki Panorama is a circular panoramic painting depicting the internment of the French Armée de l'Est in neutral Switzerland at the end of the 1870–71 Franco-Prussian War. The army, led by General Charles-Denis Bourbaki, had been defeated in the field while attempting to raise the Siege of Belfort and fled to Switzerland in the aftermath. The Swiss admitted the French soldiers, and local villagers and the Swiss Red Cross provided aid.

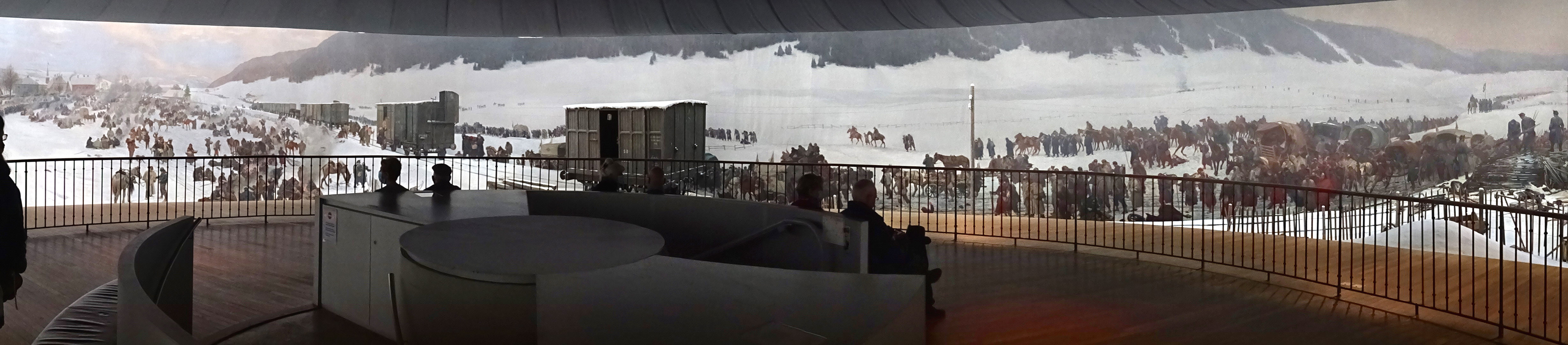
The panorama in 2021, only partly visible in this photograph.

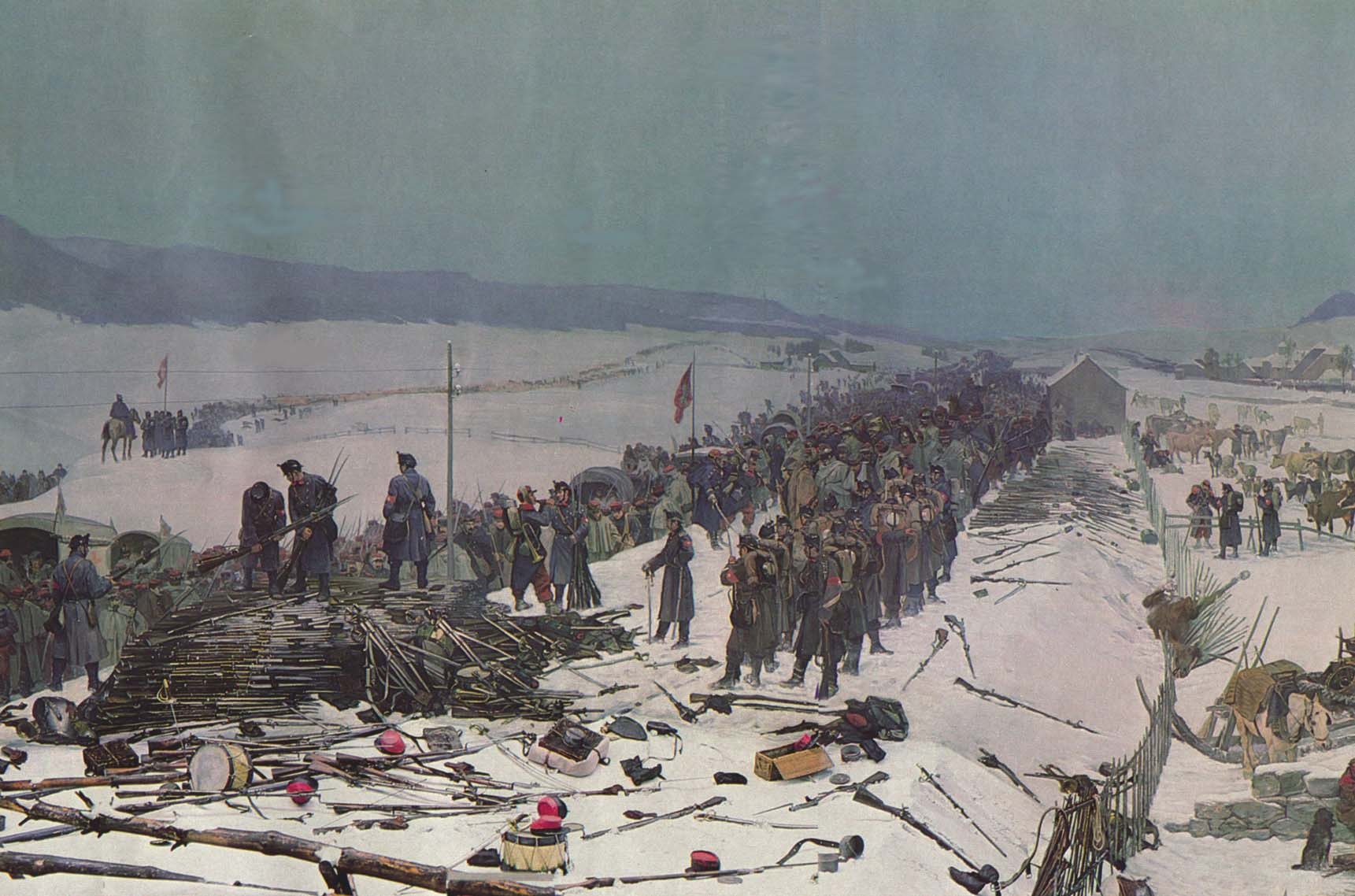
Detail showing the piling of arms

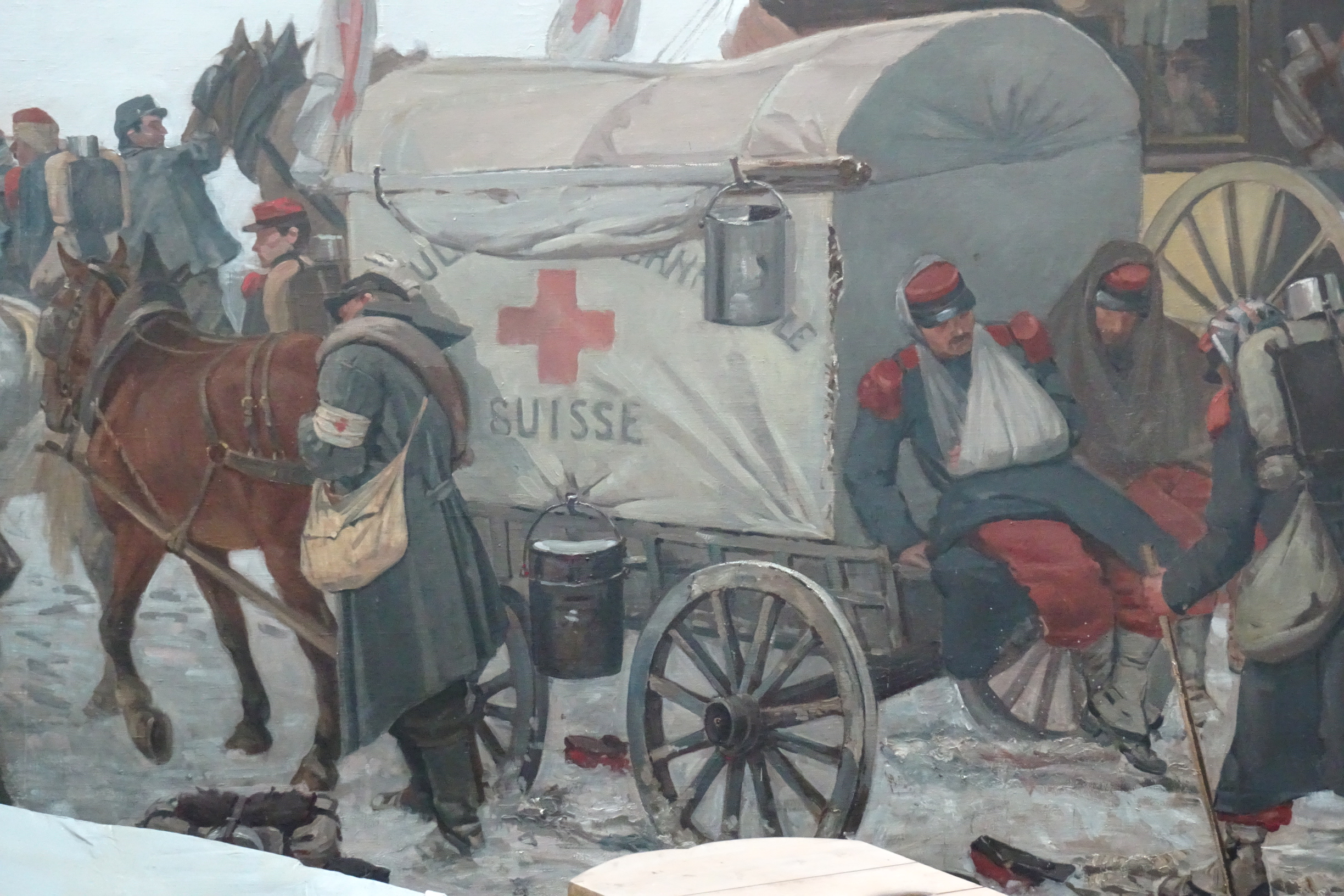
A Swiss Red Cross wagon

In 1876, the Belgium Panorama Society commissioned Swiss artist Édouard Castres, who had accompanied the Armée de l'Est as a medical volunteer, to produce a panorama for display in Switzerland as a tourist attraction. Castres and a team of ten artists produced a circular painting, measuring 115 metres (377 ft) in length, to be viewed from the centre. The work was intended to make the viewer appear as if within the scene, an effect heightened by the use of three-dimensional figures and objects placed in front of the painting. The work was exhibited at Geneva from 1881, then transferred to Lucerne in 1889, where it remains today. The painting was twice cut down, and its current height of 9.8 metres (32 ft) is around a third less than the original.

== Background ==
The subject of the painting is the movement of French General Charles-Denis Bourbaki's Armée de l'Est to neutral Switzerland in February 1871, at the end of the Franco-Prussian War. Bourbaki's army had been defeated during the 15–17 January Battle of the Lisaine, whilst unsuccessfully attempting to relieve the Siege of Belfort, so they sought internment in neutral Switzerland. Some 88,000 men marched into Switzerland via Les Verrières, abandoning 11,000 horses, 1,150 wagons, 285 artillery pieces, 7,200 rifles and 64,000 bayonets. The wounded received care from the Swiss Red Cross and local villagers. The interned men were released back to France after six weeks.

== Painting ==
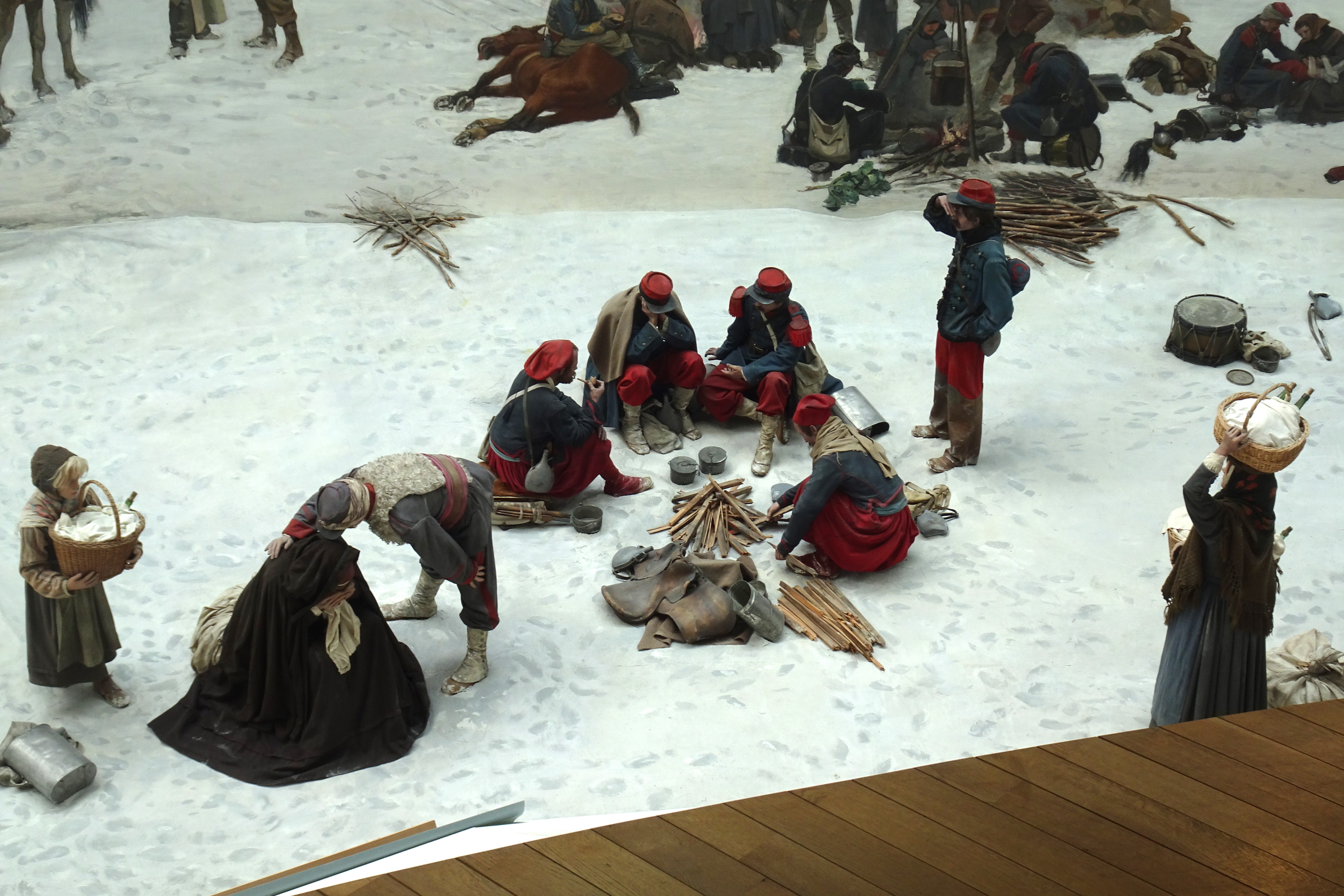
3D foreground figures

The internment was a well known event in post-war Switzerland and it was selected as the subject for a panoramic painting by the Belgium Panorama Society who hoped that a Swiss exhibition of the work would attract visitors from Switzerland and France. The Society commissioned Édouard Castres to produce the work in 1876. Castres was a Swiss artist who came to prominence in the post-war years. He had been studying art in Paris when the war broke out and his only commercial art activity was to produce copies of other works. Castres, whose family had French Huguenot ancestry, felt an obligation to assist France in the war. He volunteered as a medical assistant and acquired a horse and cart that he used to ferry the wounded from the battlefield to aid stations. Castres had accompanied the Armée de l'Est into internment. Castres afterwards produced a number of un-heroic depictions of events from the war, which were well received and brought him fame.

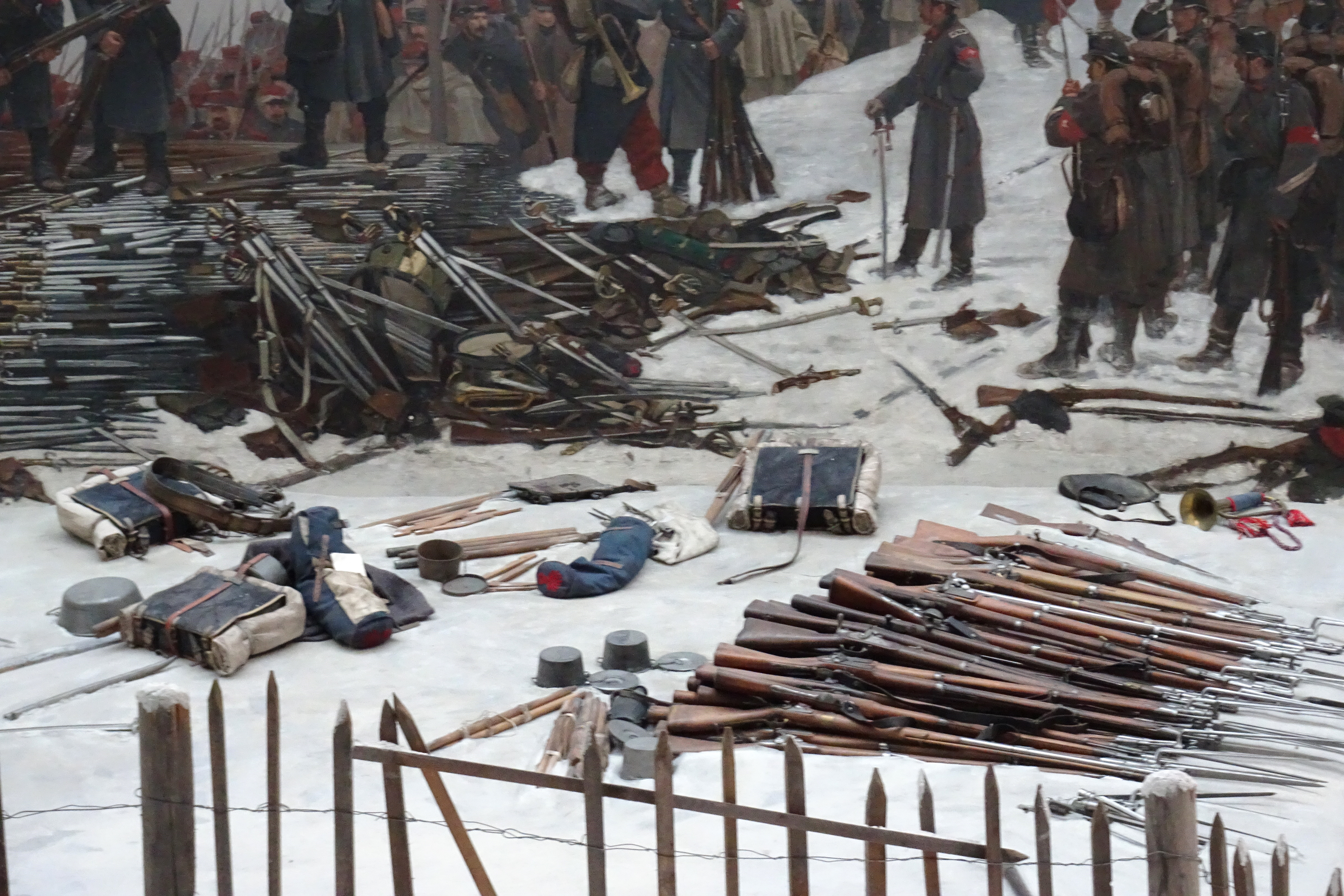
A transition between the foreground objects and the painted panorama

To prepare for the commission Castres spent the winter of 1876–77 at Verrières, sketching and painting the landscape to help him to reproduce it more accurately on the panorama. Castres worked on the panorama for five months with a team of ten painters who went largely uncredited, though it is known that Ferdinand Hodler was among them. Castres wanted to create a sense of atmosphere and so painted the panorama as if the viewer was within the scene, not looking down upon it from higher ground. Three-dimensional objects are exhibited in front of the painting, these include figures, military equipment and a railway carriage.

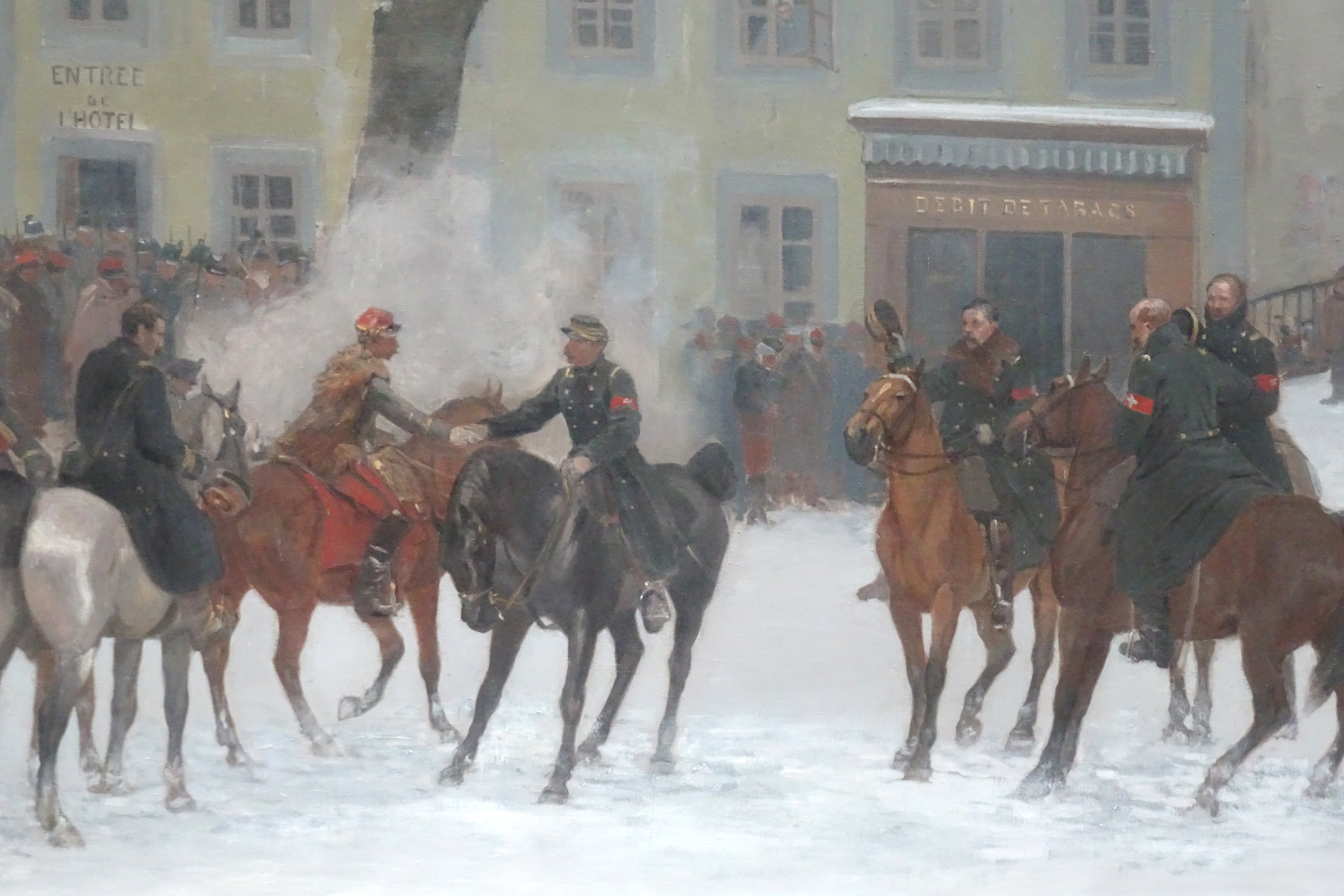
The meeting of the generals

The focus of the painting is upon the meeting of French General Justin Clinchant (to whom Bourbaki had given command of the Armée de l'Est) and the Swiss General Hans Herzog in front of the Hôtel Fédéral. The rest of the scene shows a line of weary and wounded French soldiers trekking through a snow-covered valley to pile their arms under the supervision of the Swiss Bernese Battalion. Some of the Frenchmen are being assisted by local residents and members of the Red Cross. Rail lines and straight roads provide axes of perspective. The circumference of the finished work, rendered in oil paint on canvas, is 115 metres (377 ft). The panorama is unusual in depicting the tragic consequences of war, rather than the usual celebration of victory; it is also a celebration of Swiss neutrality and hospitality.

== Later history ==
The panorama was exhibited in a timber structure at Geneva from 1881. After a number of years it was bought by Benjamin Henneburg who transferred it to Lucerne. The panorama was exhibited at Lucerne from 1889 in a structure originally built to house a panorama of the 1386 Battle of Sempach by Louis Braun; Braun had failed to complete his commission. The innovative panorama was a sensation in the late 19th century and has been compared to the modern IMAX cinema.

The panorama was twice cut down in the 20th century. It lost a third of its height from the sky and now stands 9.80 metres (32.2 ft) tall. The work was under restoration from 1977, though a 1993 photograph by Jeff Wall entitled "Restoration" and purporting to depict conservators at work on the panorama was actually posed. The panorama is currently exhibited in a wooden rotunda surrounded by a modern glass and steel structure housing shops, a cinema and restaurant. It is visited by thousands of people each year and an app has been developed that allows the panorama to be viewed in detail. The panorama is listed by the Swiss government as a cultural property of national significance.

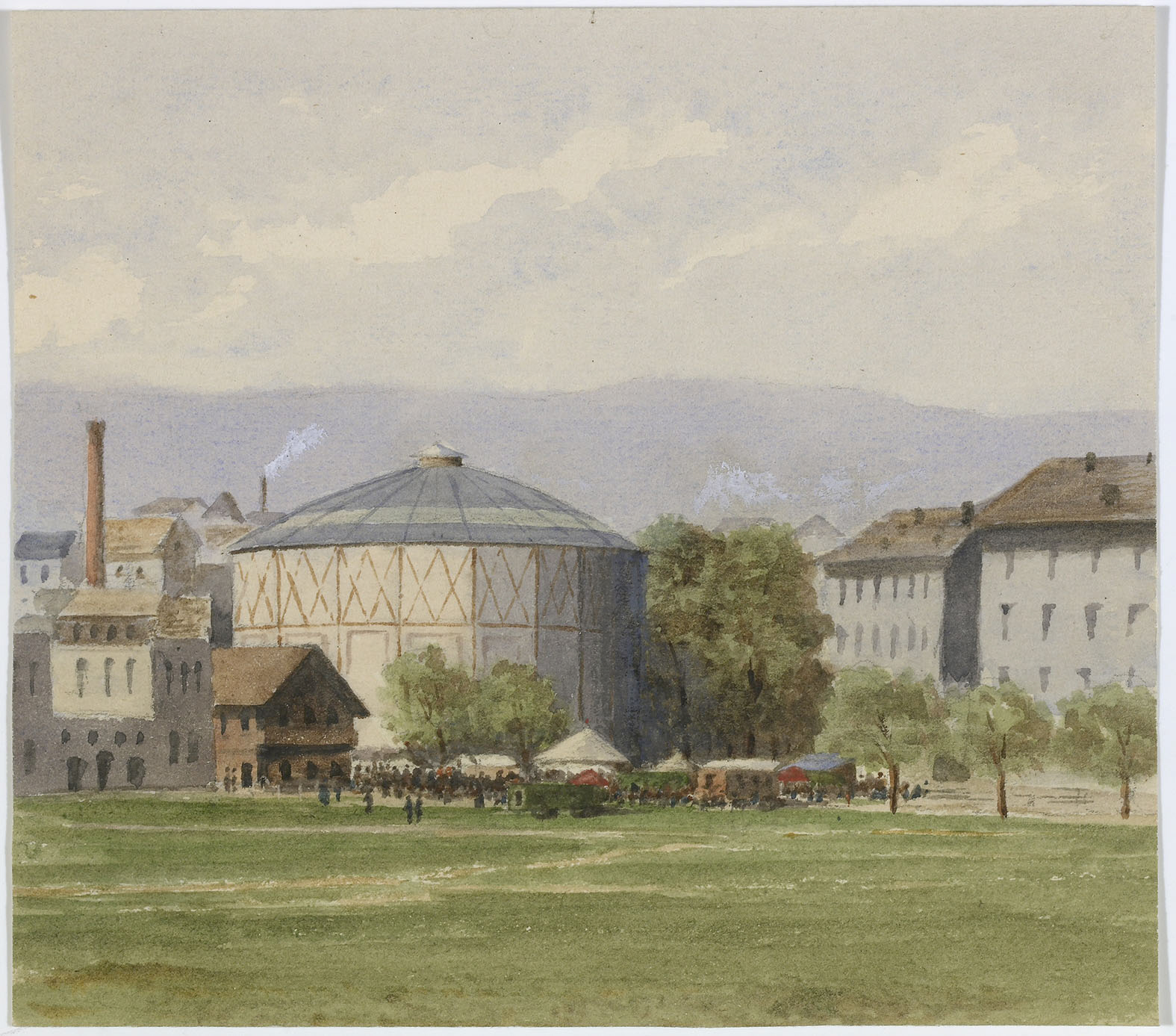
The original panorama building in Geneva

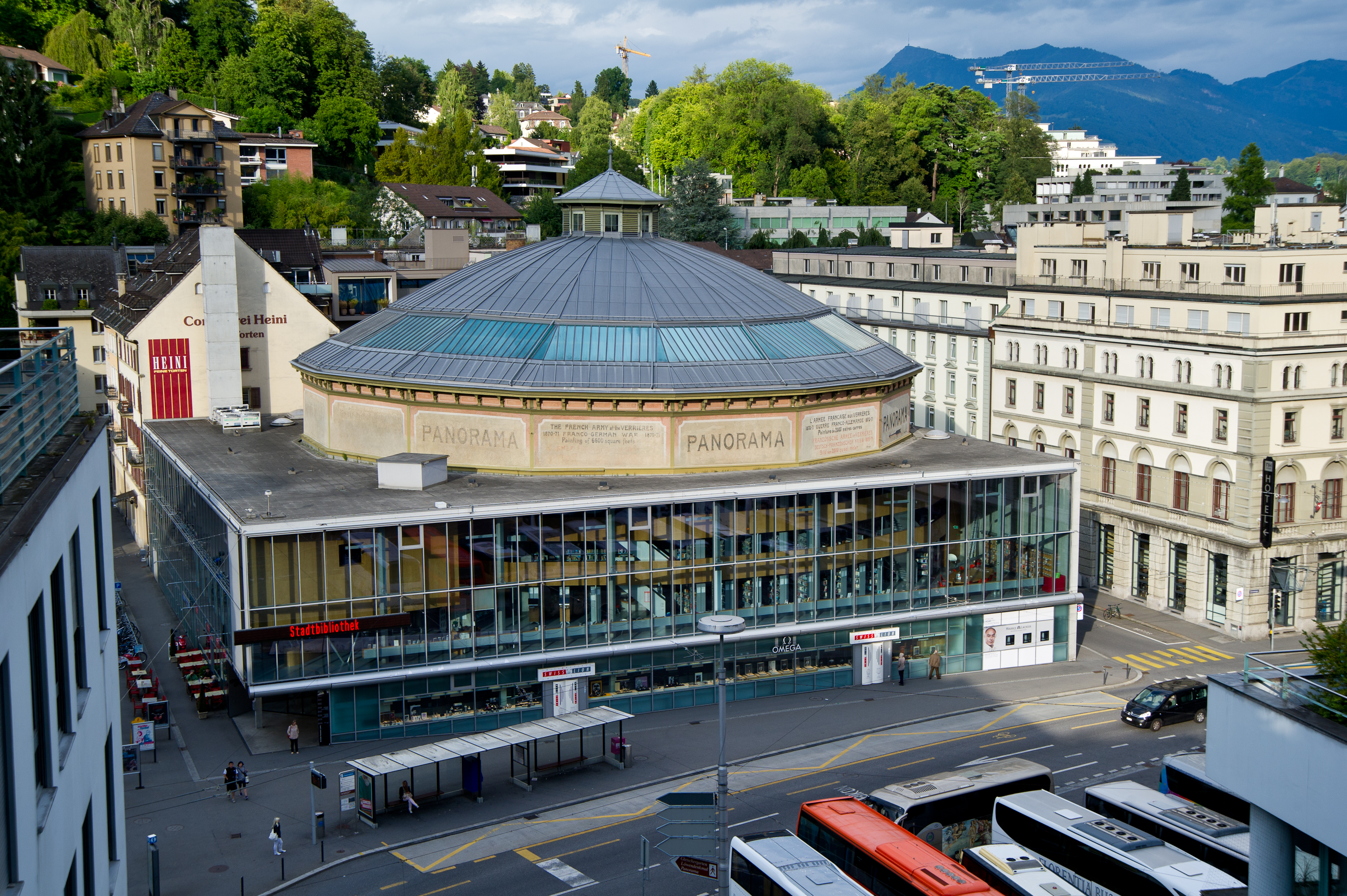
The modern panorama building in Lucerne

== See also ==
- Plainpalais
