= Armée de l'Est =

French army of the Franco-Prussian War

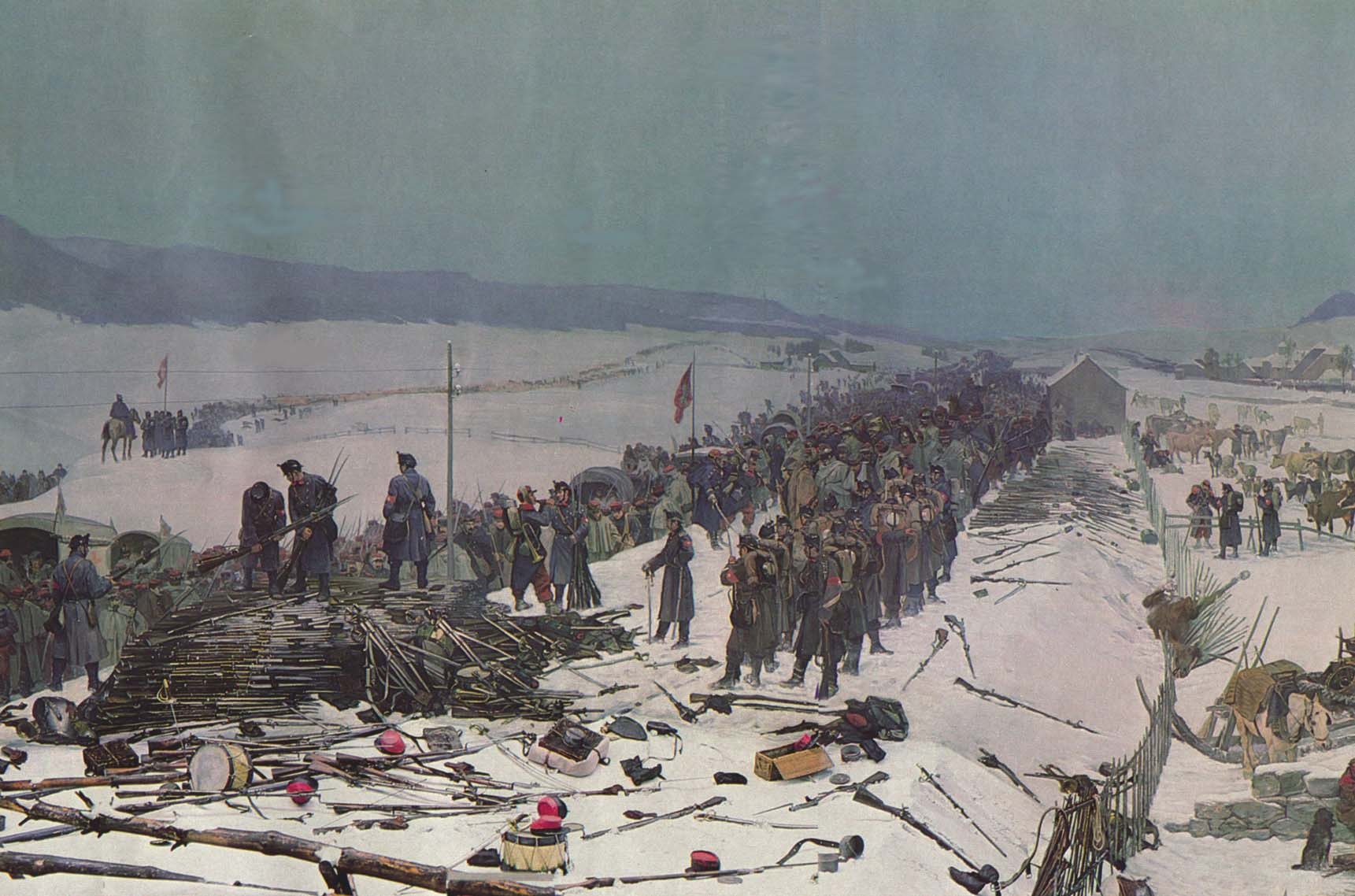
The Bourbaki army lays down its arms at the Swiss border. Part of the Bourbaki-Panorama in Lucerne, Switzerland

The Armée de l'Est (Army of the East; German - Ostarmee; also Second Loire Army; nicknamed the 'Bourbaki army' after its first commander General Charles Denis Sauter Bourbaki) was a French army which took part in the Franco-Prussian War of 1870–71. It was formed towards the end of the war out of the remains of the Loire Army, paramilitaries (Freischärlern) and new recruits.

== History ==
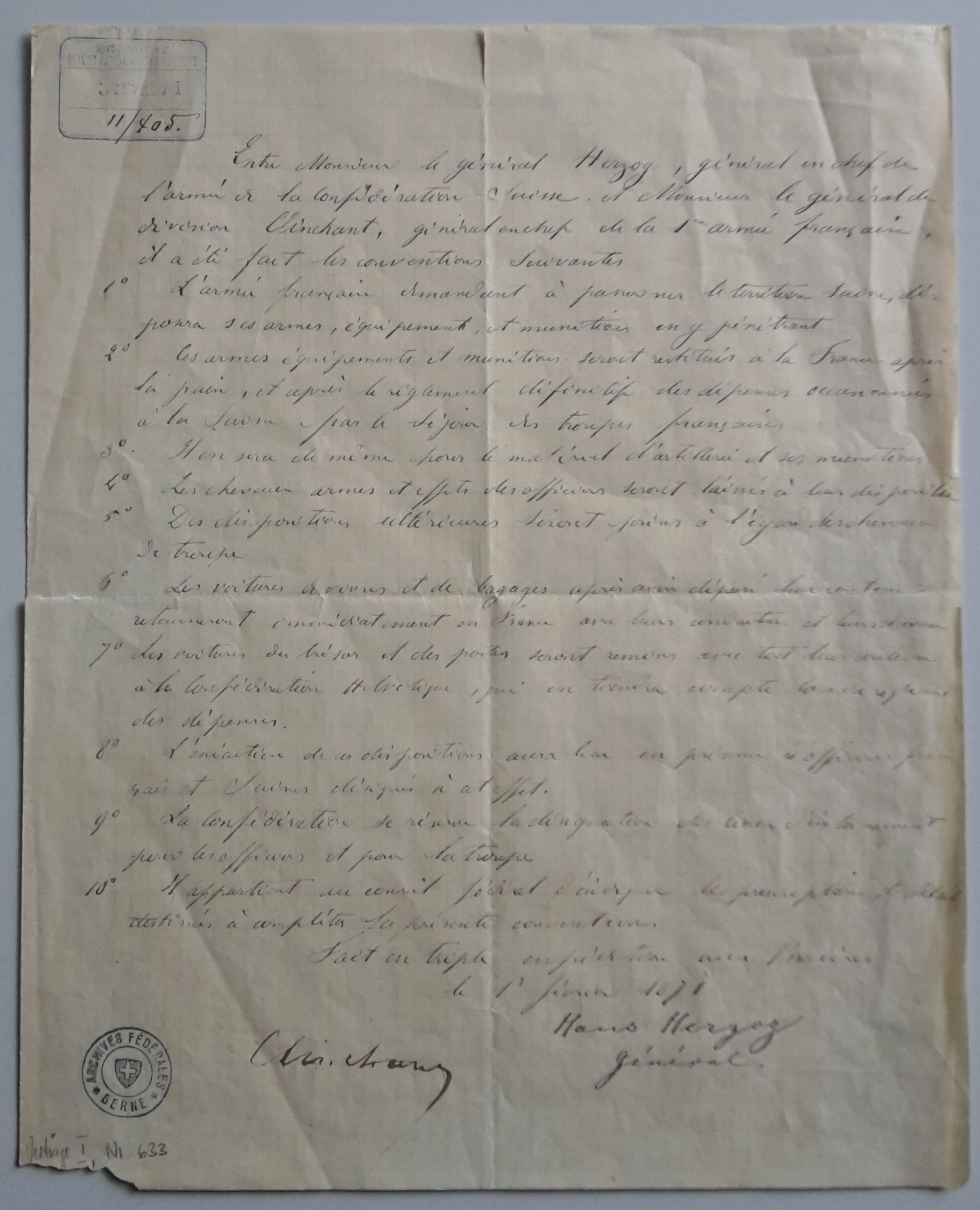
Treaty between Switzerland and France about crossing the border, 1st of February 1871

The task of the army was intended to be the relief of the besieged fortress of Belfort and the interruption of the German supply lines. However, after the French gained an advantage in the battle of Villersexel the Germans regrouped and brought in reinforcements. Subsequently, the French suffered a defeat near Belfort in the battle of the Lisaine. The retreat to the south was chaotic and slow, and the army was surrounded in the area of Pontarlier, close to the Swiss border.

General Bourbaki was relieved of his duties and made a suicide attempt. The new commanding general, Justin Clinchant, requested military asylum in Switzerland. From 1 to 3 February 1871 87,000 men crossed the Franco-Swiss border at Les Verrières and were interned for six weeks. Hans Herzog (1819–1894), Swiss general during the border occupation 1870–71, oversaw the internment of the defeated army. The crossing of the Bourbakiarmee is shown on the Bourbaki Panorama in Lucerne.

Although General Herzog had, as best he could, placed contingents of the already partly demobilized army at the places where the French were crossing the border, these units probably would have had little chance against the German pursuers of the French, led by the German General Edwin von Manteuffel. And there was theoretically a motive for such an attack: Prussia had waived its rights to Neuenburg in the Neuenburgerhandel in 1856/57 after mediation by the European powers. Neuenburg, which was where the Bourbaki troops entered Switzerland, had been a Prussian principality until 1857.

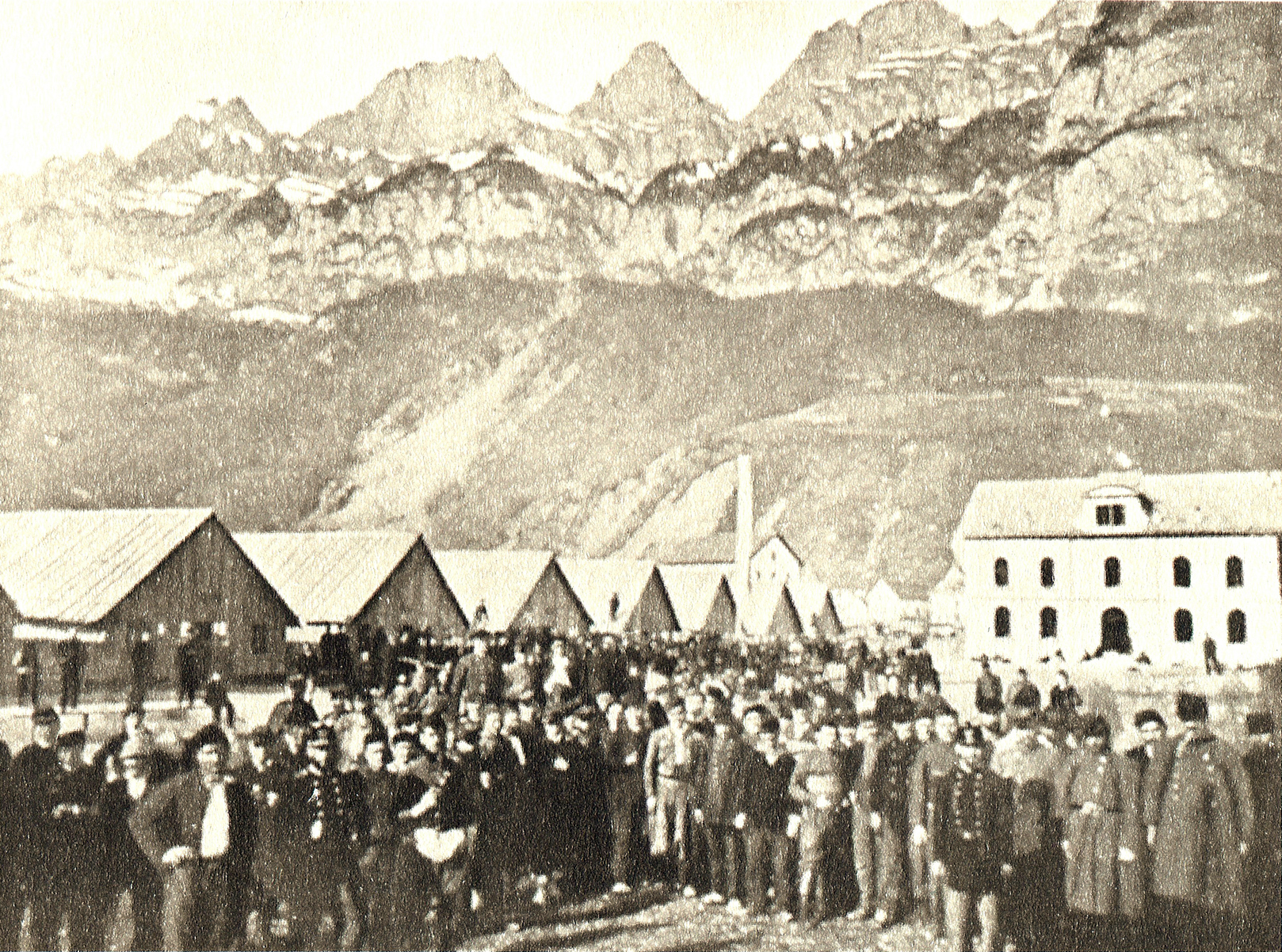
Interned Soldiers at Walenstadt, Spring 1871

The admission of 87,000 soldiers (a number equal to 3% of the then Swiss population), driven by hunger and cold, who had to be housed, medically treated and guarded, placed major demands on the young Swiss federal state. The internees were distributed to 188 localities in all cantons except the Ticino, because it was not reasonable to send the internees over the snow-covered Gotthard in January - the railway through the Gotthard was only opened in 1882. In addition to military, government and relief agencies, the civilian population also contributed substantially to the aid and housing of the soldiers. Most of them did not only need medical treatment but also new clothes and shoes. Some hundred of them were too weak to survive the ordeal and were buried on Swiss ground.

The humanitarian mission contributed to the self-confidence and identity of the young Switzerland.

== Cultural Inheritance ==
Still to this day, a Swiss soldier is said to be “in the Bourbaki army” if he's to be blamed for wearing his uniform in an unusual or saggy way. Blaming an entire group of soldiers this way is a strong criticism.
