= August von Werder =

Prussian general (1808–1887)

Graf August von Werder
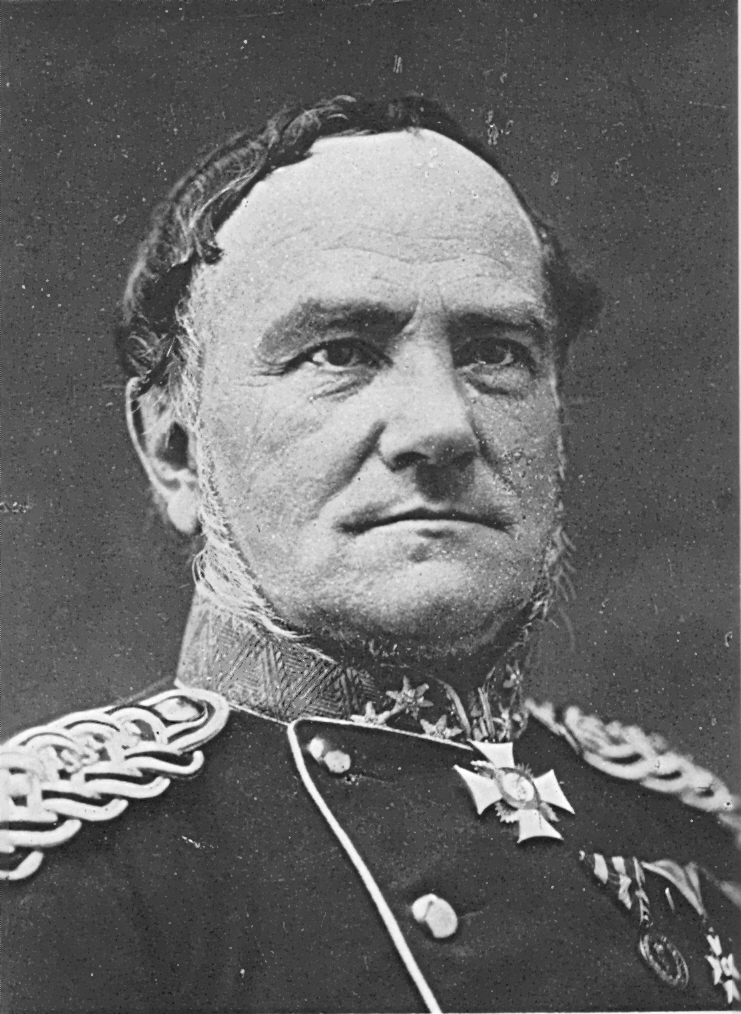
- Werder in 1870
- Born: 12 September 1808; Schloßberg, East Prussia, Kingdom of Prussia
- Died: 12 September 1887 (aged 79); Grüssow, Pomerania, German Empire
- Military career
- Allegiance: Kingdom of Prussia; North German Confederation; German Empire
- Branch: Prussian Army; Imperial German Army
- Service years: 1825–1879
- Rank: General of the Infantry
- Conflicts: Caucasian War; Austro-Prussian War: Battle of Gitschin; Battle of Königgrätz; Franco-Prussian War: Siege of Strasbourg; Siege of Belfort; Battle of Villersexel; Battle of the Lisaine
- Awards: Pour le Mérite; Order of the Red Eagle; Grand Cross of the Iron Cross

Karl Wilhelm Friedrich August Leopold Graf von Werder (12 September 1808 – 12 September 1887) was a Prussian general.

== Life and career ==
=== Early life and assignments ===
Werder was born in Schloßberg near Norkitten (now in Chernyakhovsky District) in the Province of East Prussia. He entered the Prussian Gardes du Corps in 1825, transferring the following year into the Guard Infantry, with which he served for many years as a subaltern. In 1839 he was appointed an instructor in the Cadet Corps, and later he was employed in the topographical bureau of the Great General Staff. In 1842-1843 he took part in the Russian operations in the Caucasus, and on his return to Germany in 1846, was placed, as a captain, on the staff. In 1848 he married. Regimental and staff duty alternately occupied him until 1863, when he was made major-general, and given the command of a brigade of Guard Infantry.

=== Command in the wars against Denmark and France ===
In the Austro-Prussian War of 1866, Werder commanded the 3rd Division, which was part of the Second Army. Despite a lack of supply, Werder distinguished himself at Gitschin and Königgratz. He returned home with the rank of lieutenant-general and the Order Pour le Mérite. In 1870, at first employed with the 3rd Army Headquarters and in command of the Württemberg and Baden forces, he was after the Battle of Wörth entrusted with the operations against Strasbourg, which he captured after a long and famous siege.

Promoted general of infantry, and assigned to command the new XIVth Army Corps, Werder defeated the French at Dijon and at Nuits, and, when Charles-Denis Bourbaki's army moved forward to relieve Belfort, turned upon him and fought the desperate action of Battle of Villersexel, which enabled him to cover the Germans besieging Belfort. On 15, 16 and 17 January 1871, Werder with greatly inferior forces succeeded in holding his own on the Battle of the Lisaine against all Bourbaki's efforts to reach Belfort, a victory which aroused great enthusiasm in southern Germany. In the course of this enthusiastic prevailing mood, a monument - the Siegesdenkmal - was erected in Freiburg im Breisgau to honor his services and the victory of the German people in the Franco-Prussian War.

=== Retirement ===
After the war Werder commanded the Baden forces, now called the XlVth Army Corps, until he retired in 1879. On his retirement he was raised to the dignity of count. He died in 1887 at Grüssow in Pomerania. The 30th (4th Rhenish) Infantry regiment carried his name, and there is a statue of Werder at Freiburg im Breisgau.

== Honours and awards ==
- Kingdom of Prussia:
  - Knight of Honour of the Johanniter Order, 28 September 1844
  - Pour le Mérite (military), 20 September 1866; with Oak Leaves, 17 January 1871
  - Service Award Cross
  - Grand Cross of the Red Eagle, with Oak Leaves and Swords, 22 January 1871
  - Grand Cross of the Iron Cross (1870), 22 March 1871
  - Knight of the Black Eagle, 9 September 1875; with Collar, 1876
  - Grand Commander's Cross of the Royal House Order of Hohenzollern, with Star, 22 September 1877
- Hohenzollern: Cross of Honour of the Princely House Order of Hohenzollern, 1st Class with Swords
- Austrian Empire: Commander of the Imperial Order of Leopold, 19 December 1863
- Baden:
  - Grand Cross of the Military Karl-Friedrich Merit Order, 6 April 1871
  - Grand Cross of the Zähringer Lion, with Swords and Golden Collar, 1872; with Star in Diamonds, 14 October 1875
  - Knight of the House Order of Fidelity, 1879
- Kingdom of Bavaria: Grand Cross of the Military Merit Order, 4 April 1871
- Grand Duchy of Hesse: Grand Cross of the Ludwig Order, 10 April 1872
- Mecklenburg-Schwerin: Military Merit Cross, 1st Class, 4 December 1866
- Nassau: Commander of the Order of Adolphe of Nassau, 1st Class with Swords, February 1861
- Russian Empire:
  - Knight of St. George, 3rd Class, 27 December 1870
  - Knight of St. Alexander Nevsky, 20 June 1871
  - Knight of St. Vladimir, 4th Class with Swords
- Schwarzburg: Princely Schwarzburg Honor Cross , 1st Class
- Württemberg:
  - Grand Cross of the Military Merit Order, 30 December 1870
  - Grand Cross of the Württemberg Crown, 1877
