= Federal intervention in Switzerland =

Federal intervention in the Swiss Confederation

In Switzerland, a federal intervention is an action undertaken by the federal government either within a canton or against a canton (in the latter case, it is termed a federal execution).

== Legislation ==
Federal intervention is authorized under Article 52 of the Federal Constitution, which states:

Art. 52 Constitutional order
1 The Confederation shall protect the constitutional order of the Cantons.
2 It shall intervene when public order in a Canton is disrupted or under threat and the Canton in question is not able to maintain it with its own forces or with the aid of other Cantons.

— Federal Constitution of the Swiss Confederation of 18 April 1999

This intervention is also detailed in Articles 173 paragraphs 1 to 3 (Further duties and powers), and 186 (Cooperation between the Confederation and the Cantons).

An intervention may only be decided by the Federal Assembly. However, in urgent cases, the Federal Council may order one and seek subsequent approval. This provision has never been invoked. When deciding on an intervention, Parliament typically appoints one or more civil or military commissioners tasked with mediation and authorized to request military support if necessary.

During an intervention, principles of federalism are temporarily suspended, and public authority shifts from the canton to the Confederation.

== Interventions within cantons ==
Since the adoption of the Federal Constitution of 1848, ten interventions have been ordered within cantons, half of them in the Canton of Ticino:

Date	Event	Canton	Details
1855	Pronunciamento	Ticino	Conflicts between radicals and conservatives
1856	Neuchâtel Crisis	Neuchâtel	Royalist coup d'état
1864	Riots following the non-election of James Fazy	Geneva	Fazy was one of the founders of the Radical Party
1870	Conflict over the choice of the cantonal capital	Ticino	Dispute over the cantonal capital
1871	Tonhalle riot	Zürich	Disturbances between interned members of the Armée de l'Est and Germans celebrating their victory, later joined by workers
1875	Miners' strike at the Gotthard tunnel	Uri	Gotthard strike
1876	Stabio struggles	Ticino	Conflicts between radicals and conservatives in Stabio
1889	Struggles during elections to the Grand Council	Ticino	Party conflicts during Grand Council elections
1890	September Revolution	Ticino	Overthrow of the conservative Respini government and death of State Councillor Luigi Rossi during an uprising on 11 September by liberal-radicals dissatisfied with the delay in examining a constitutional revision proposal
1932	November 1932 Geneva shooting	Geneva	Riots between right- and left-wing extremists

== Federal execution ==
A federal execution is an intervention by the Confederation against a canton that fails to fulfill its obligations. Preceded by a formal warning, it may involve substitution, suspension of subsidies, or—as a last resort—military intervention, which has never occurred.

Date	Description	Canton
1850	Dispatch of federal commissioners to monitor political refugees	Geneva
1855	Dispatch of federal commissioners to monitor political refugees	Geneva
1869	Enforcement of an arbitral award	Uri
1884	Adoption by Ticino of electoral provisions illegal under federal law	Ticino

== See also ==
- Swiss Federal Constitution
- Neuchâtel Crisis
- Sonderbund War

== Bibliography ==
- Wili, Hans-Urs (2018). "Federal interventions". Historical Dictionary of Switzerland.
- Hilty, C. (1891). "Die eidgenössischen Interventionen" [The federal interventions]. Politisches Jahrbuch der Schweizerischen Eidgenossenschaft (in German).
