= Battle of Villersexel =

Battle in France

Coordinates: 47.5514°N 6.4339°E

- Part of Franco-Prussian War
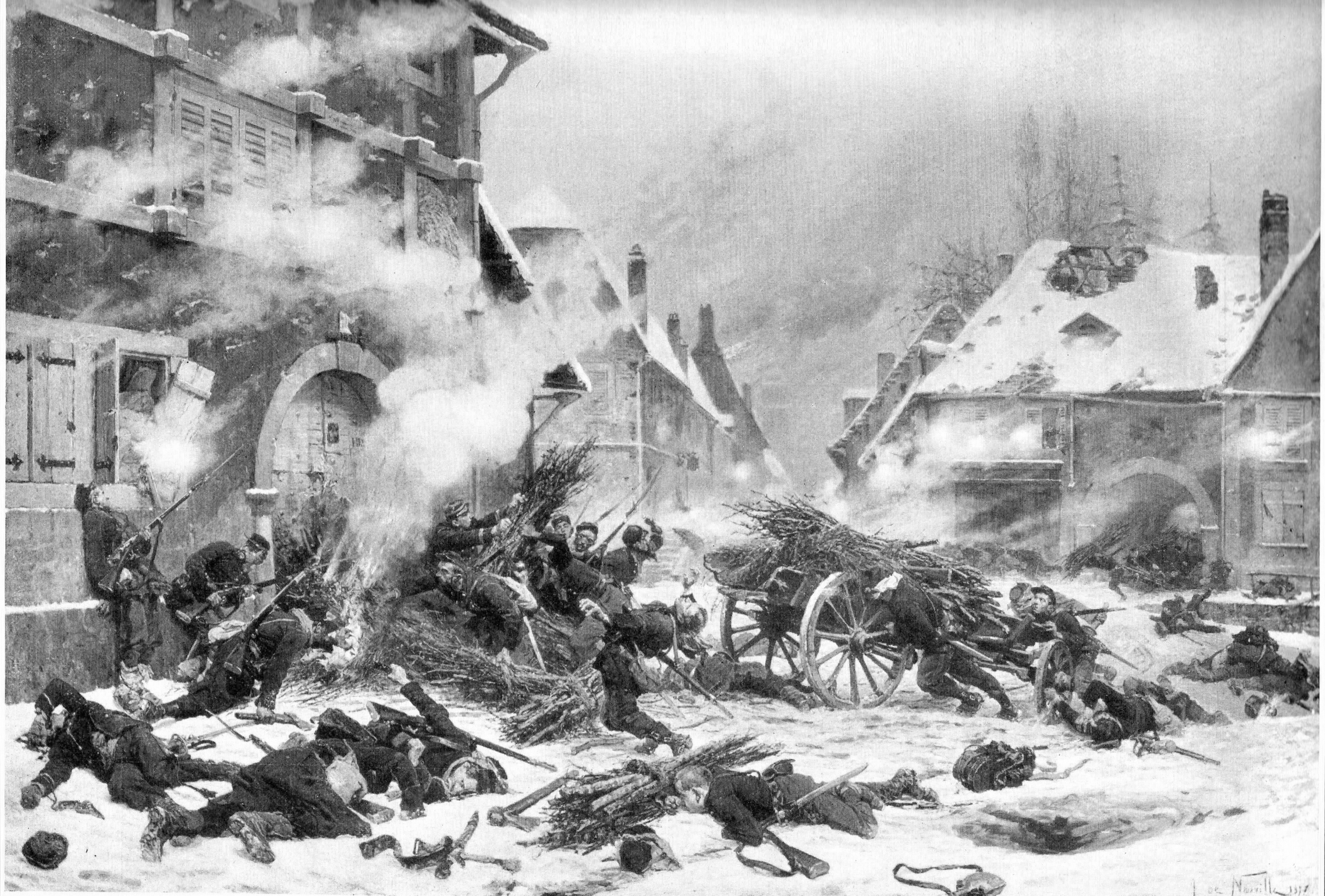
- La bataille de Villersexel by Alphonse de Neuville (1834-1885).
Date	9 January 1871
Location	Villersexel, France
Result	French victory

Belligerents
North German Confederation: Prussia; Baden	French Republic

Commanders and leaders
(Kingdom of Prussia) August von Werder	(France) Charles Denis Bourbaki

Strength
15,000	20,000

Casualties and losses
578 438 dead or wounded, 140 captured	1,354 654 dead or wounded, 700 captured

The Battle of Villersexel took place on 9 January 1871 as part of the Franco-Prussian War. Elements of the French Armée de l'Est under General Bourbaki engaged August von Werder's German forces. It resulted in a French victory.

== Background ==
In the turmoil and confusion following the capitulations at Sedan and Metz and the continued besiegement of Paris, the remaining French armies faced major supply difficulties which restricted their movements. The Armée de l'Est was tasked with reaching and assisting Belfort, where Colonel Denfert-Rochereau still held out.

== Battle ==
Werder's XIV Corps caught up to Bourbaki in the evening of 9 January at Villersexel, where a French detachment had taken positions the evening before. Prussian troops, filing through an unguarded pass, rapidly overwhelmed the positions surrounding the bridge over the Ognon. By 13:00h the château fell to the Prussians. However, the French lines at Esprels, Autrey-le-Vay, and, to the east, Villers-la-Ville, successfully checked the Prussian attack.

Around noon Werder ordered two brigades of the Baden Field Division, which were marching towards Athesans, to reinforce the Prussians at Villersexel. Arriving late, they would only be lightly engaged during the battle. A French counterattack organized by Bourbaki pressed steadily forth in the afternoon and recaptured the château after confused street fighting. Fighting continued into the night until the retreat of the Prussians at 03:00h. Bourbaki continued his march on 13 January, while Werder fell back some 20 kilometers north along the Lisaine.

== Results of the battle ==
Though the French sustained heavier losses they managed to drive the Prussian armies from their barricades.

The Chateau des Villersexel, then known as Château des Grammont, was destroyed during the battle. The Château was later rebuilt. The village, also burned, was particularly affected in its lower part to Ognon.

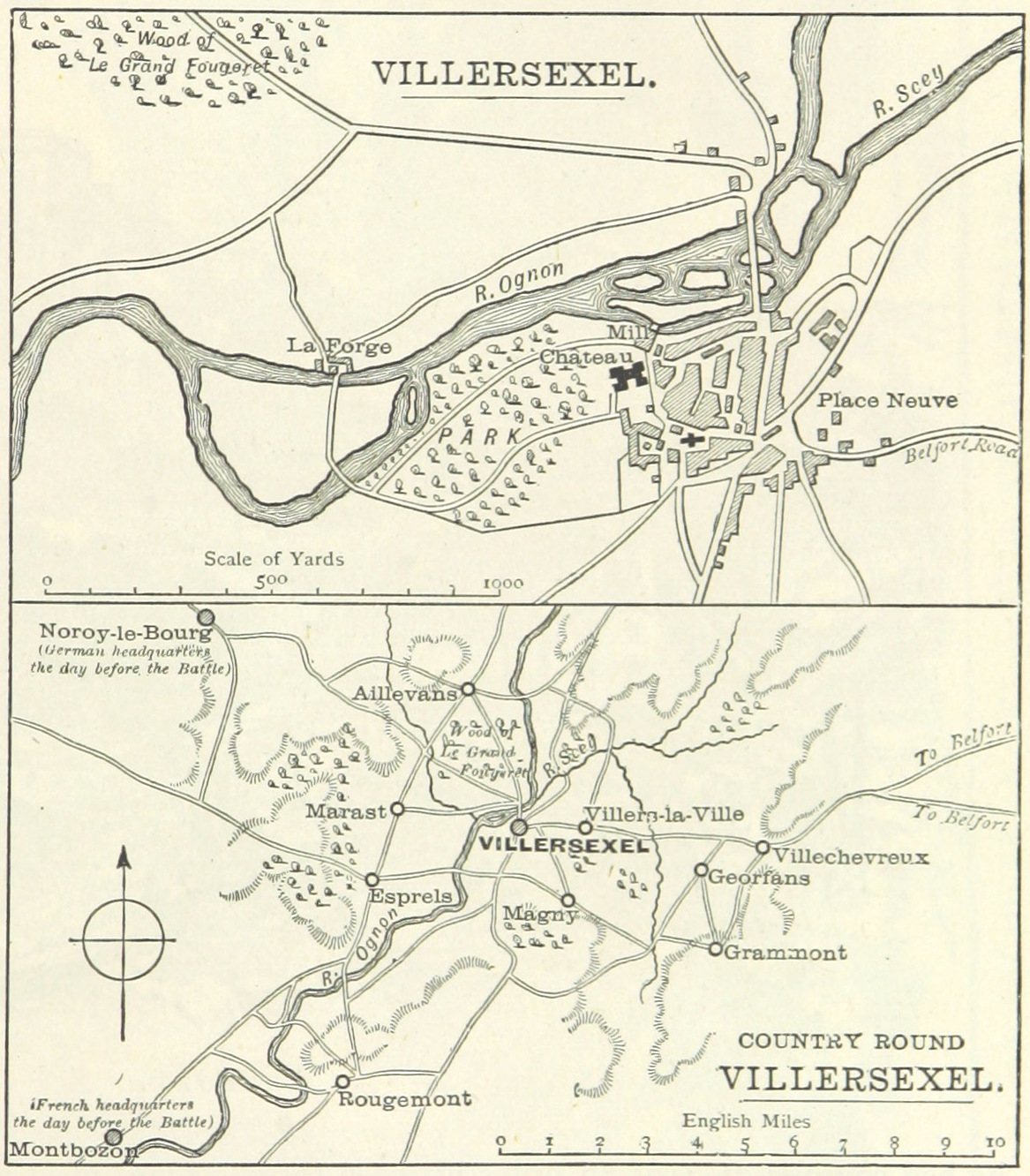
A map of the area around Villersexel at the time of the battle

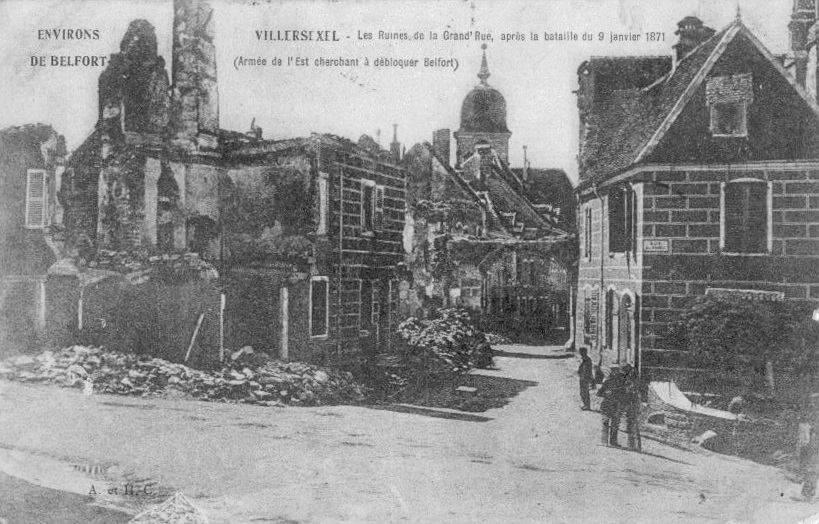
View of destruction to the village

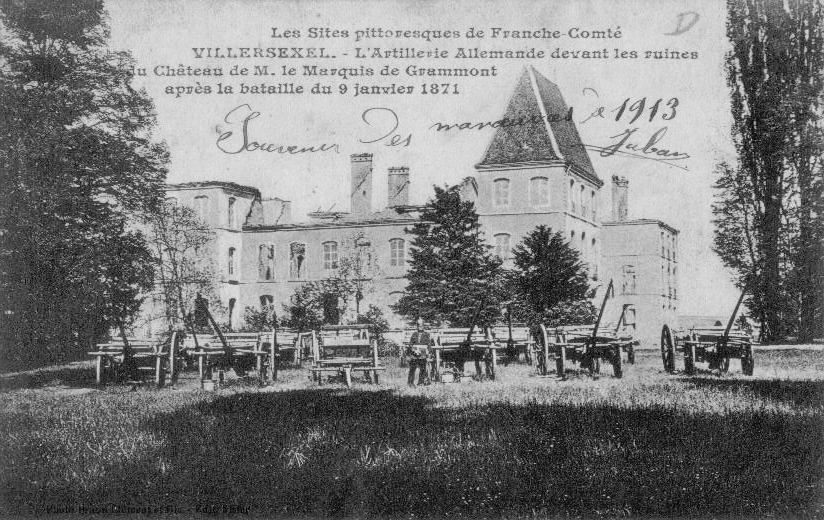
Artillery placements at the ruins of the Château

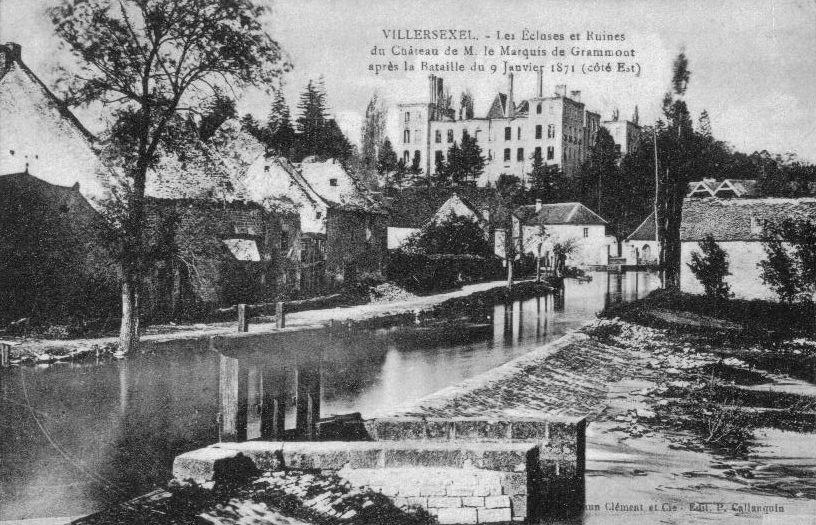
View of destruction in the lower portion of the village
