= Villersexel =

- Commune
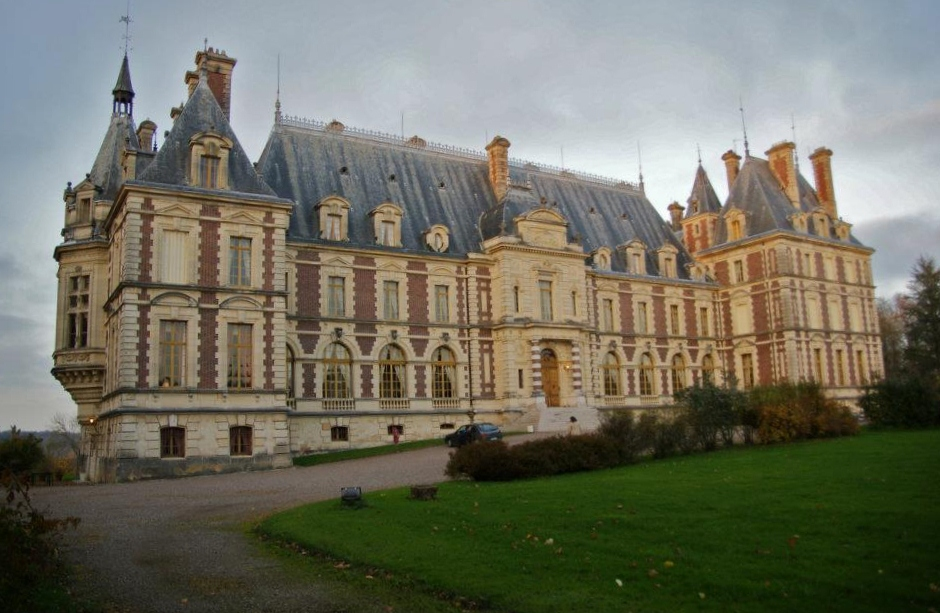
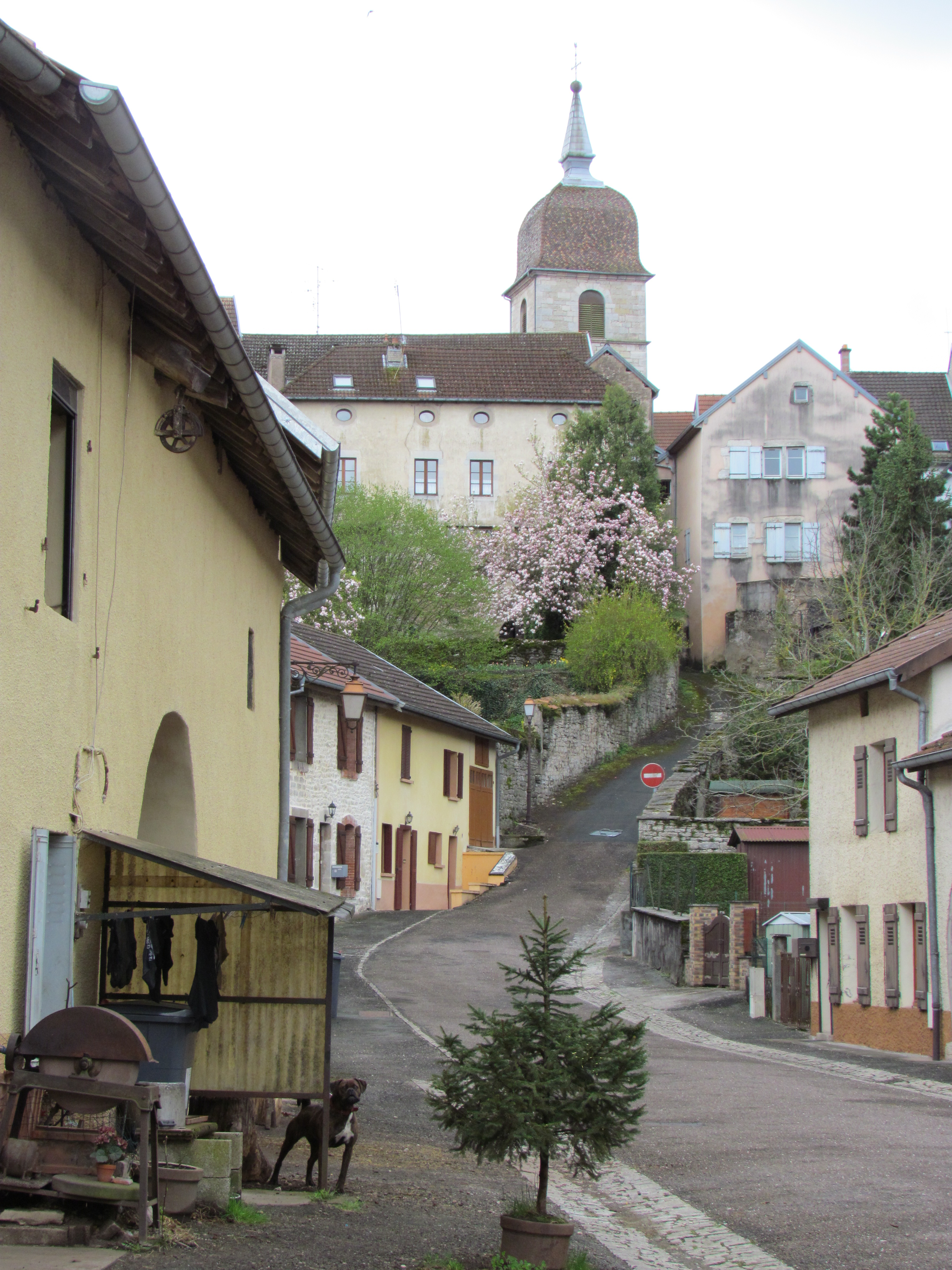
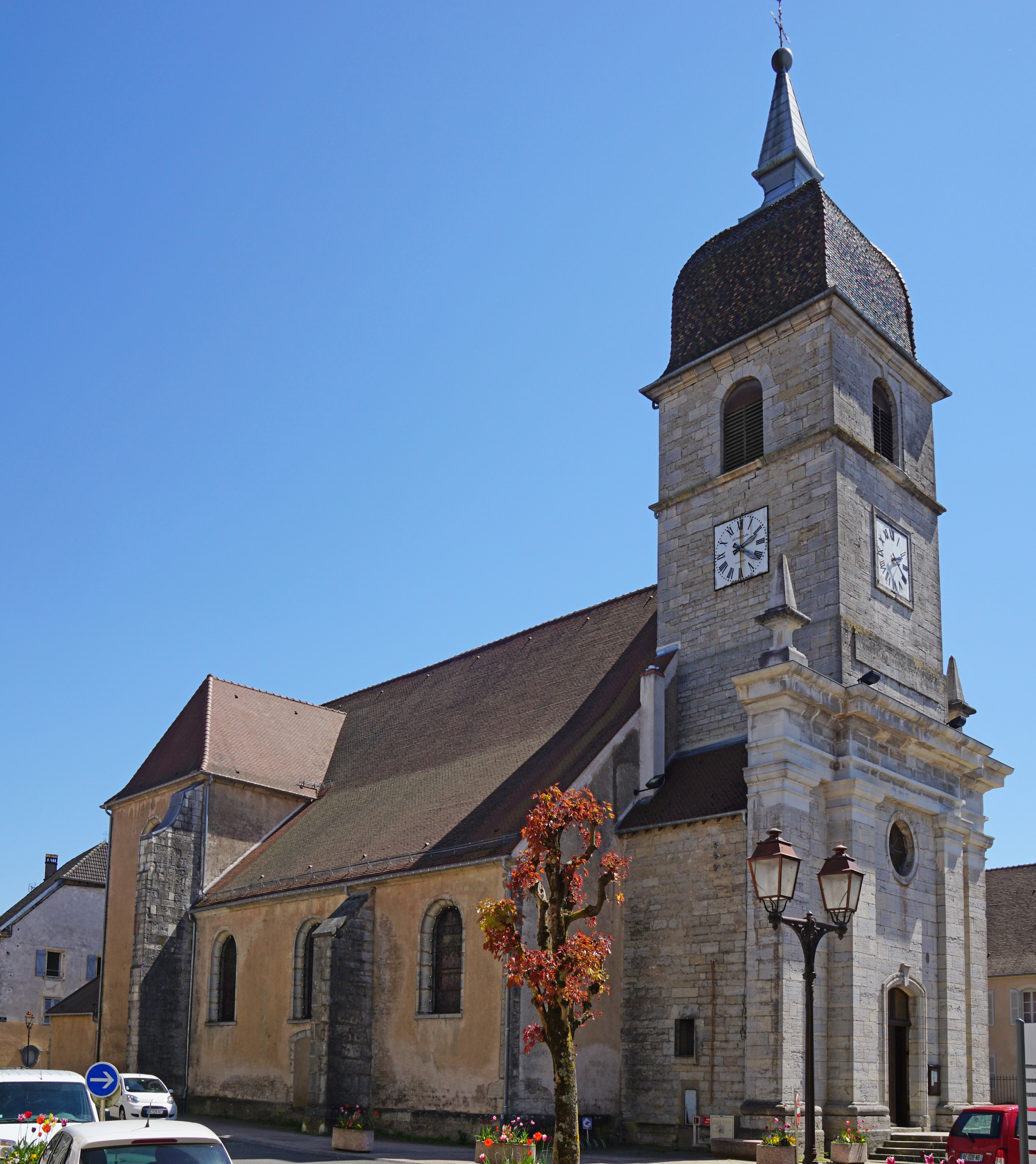
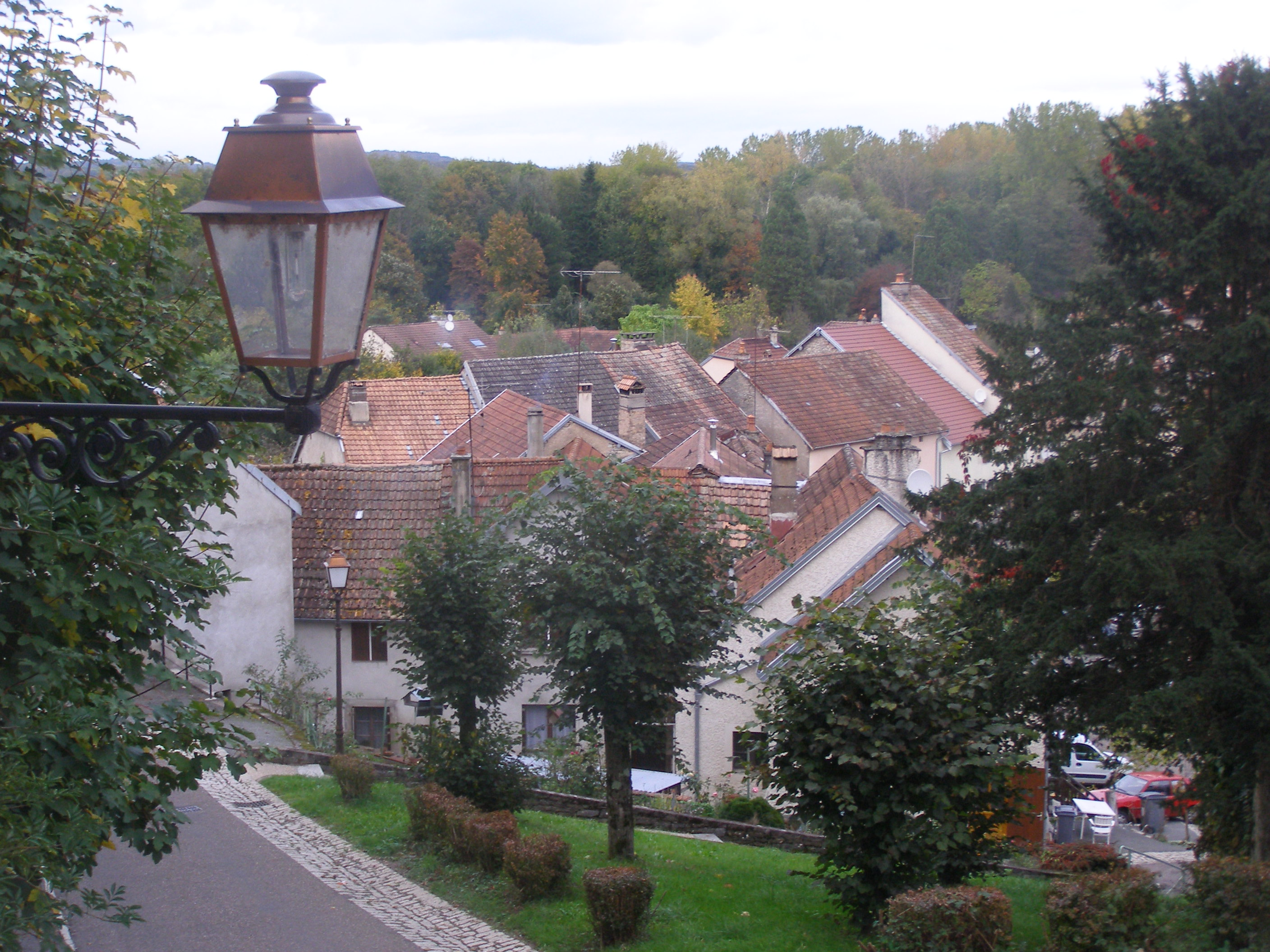
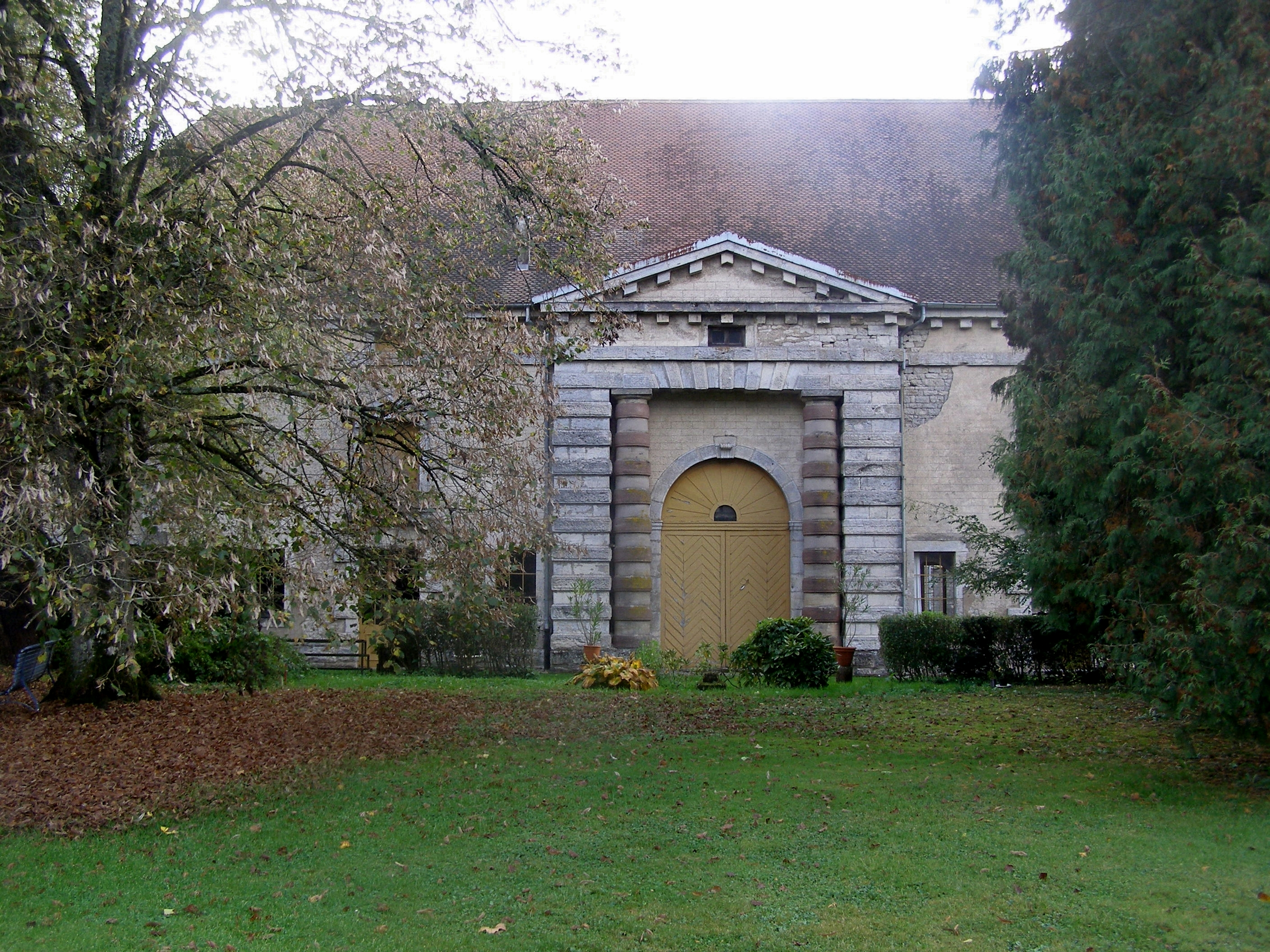
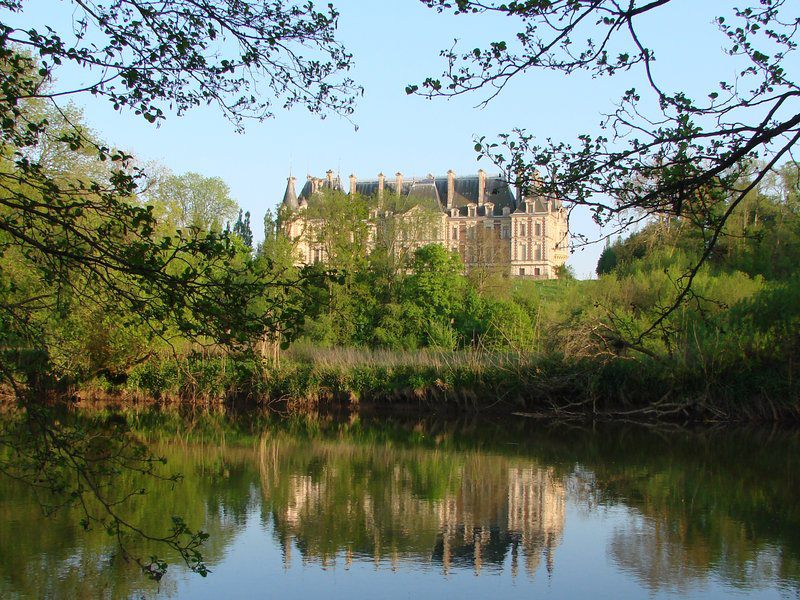

- Coat of arms
- Location of Villersexel
- Location within France Location within Bourgogne-Franche-Comté
- Coordinates: 47°33′05″N 6°26′02″E
- Country: France
- Region: Bourgogne-Franche-Comté
- Department: Haute-Saône
- Arrondissement: Lure
- Canton: Villersexel
- Intercommunality: CC Pays de Villersexel

Government
  - Mayor (2020–2026): Gérard Chapuis
- Area^{1}: 13.19 km^{2} (5.09 sq mi)
- Highest elevation: 318 m (1,043 ft)
- Lowest elevation: 257 m (843 ft)
- Population (2023): 1,431
  - Density: 108.5/km^{2} (281.0/sq mi)
- Time zone: UTC+01:00 (CET)
  - Summer (DST): UTC+02:00 (CEST)
- INSEE/Postal code: 70561 /70110
- ^{1} French Land Register data, which excludes lakes, ponds, glaciers > 1 km^{2} (0.386 sq mi or 247 acres) and river estuaries.

Villersexel (French pronunciation: [vilɛʁsɛksɛl]) is a commune in the Haute-Saône department in the region of Bourgogne-Franche-Comté in eastern France. The current population is about 1,400 residents (2022). The town center includes several restaurants, a school, a church and the Château de Villersexel.

== Battle of Villersexel ==
In 1871, a battle occurred within the area of Villersexel, with the chateau changing hands between the French and Prussians.

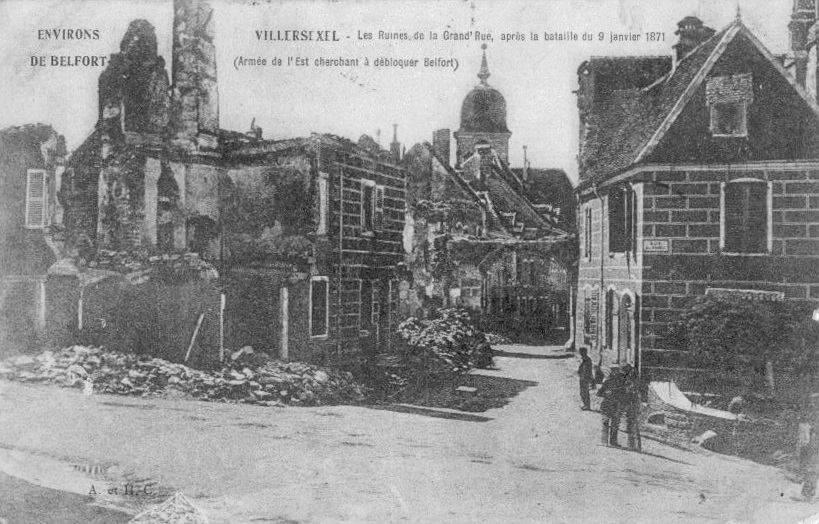
View of destruction to the village

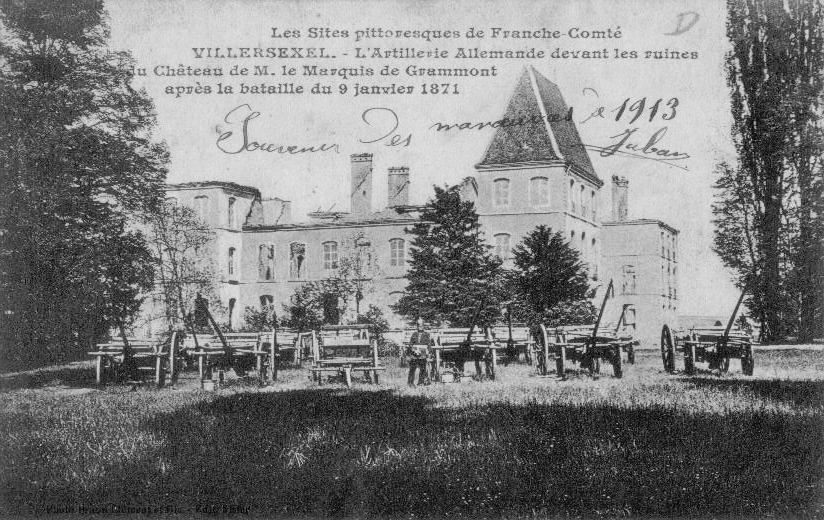
Artillery placements at the ruins of the Château

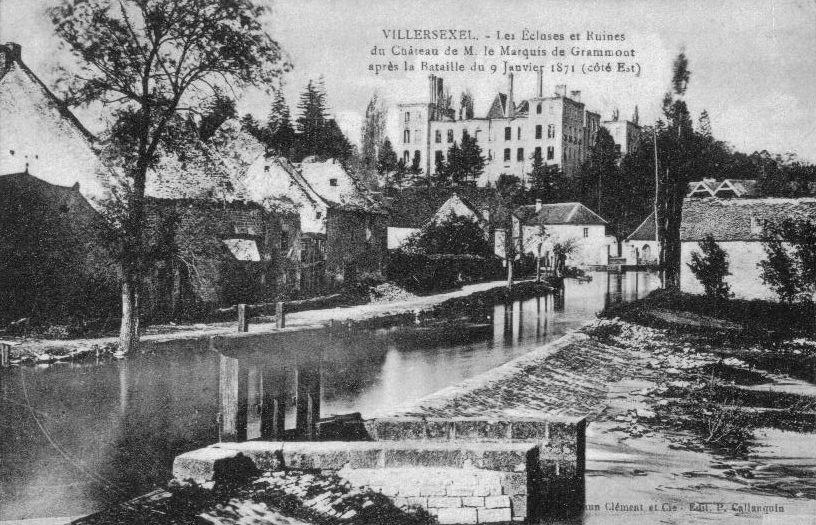
view of destruction to the lower portion of the village

== Chateau ==
The Château de Villersexel is located within the heart of the commune of Villersexel. The current chateau was built over a short period of time circa 1871 in the architectural style of Louis XIII. Originally, the chateau was known as the Chateau des Grammont.

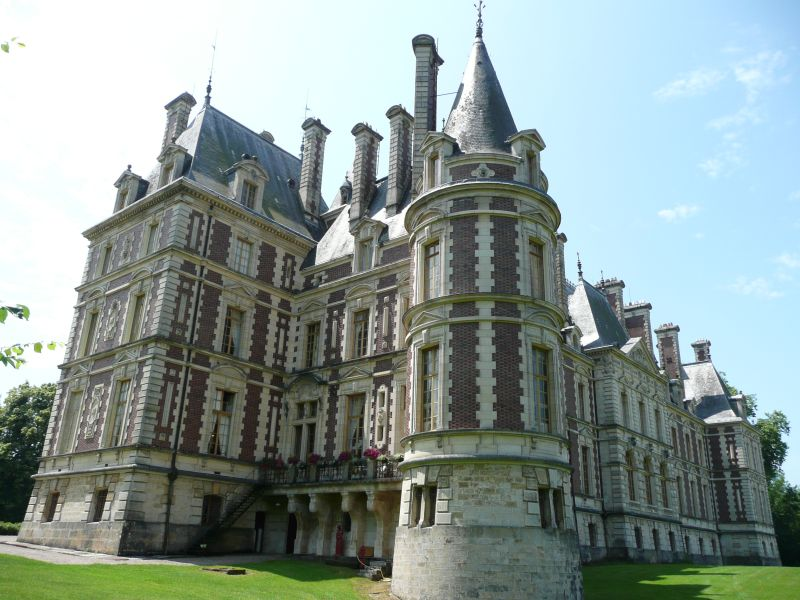
The Chateau de Villersexel

=== History of Chateau ===
The current chateau was built in only a few years. Two previous chateau's have stood on the current site. Both previous chateau's were largely destroyed by fire. The fire which destroyed the second chateau occurred during the Battle of Villersexel. Remnants of the second chateau remain on the grounds. The second chateau was reportedly larger than the current chateau. Reportedly, both of the earlier chateau's were largely constructed of wooden timbers, as was common for many chateaus constructed during the 17th and 18th century.

After the second chateau was destroyed by fire, the baron was looking for a new architect who could design and build a structure that was more resistant to fire. The architect of the current building is Eugène Gustave Édouard Danjoy, who applied metal structures to support the floors and in the main staircase. The Chateau is registered as a historic building in France. The Château de Villersexel is entirely furnished in the style of that period.

Currently, the Château de Villersexel is privately owned, and serves several purposes. It is a private residence for the owners and their family and houses a small museum. Additionally, the Chateau serves as a destination for weddings, receptions, and other large events. This Chateau offers a venue for events, including weddings, shows and receptions. Rooms can accommodate up to 100 people, and the chateau can house up to 100 people overnight.

The Chateau is reported to have housed many famous guests and residents, including Lafayette, who is reported to have lived in this Chateau, with stays by Charles De Gaulle and Winston Churchill.

The Chateau receives constant upkeep and renovations, with the bedrooms reflecting history with names such as : Empire, Honneur, Rotonde and Montebello.

== See also ==
- Communes of the Haute-Saône department
- Battle of Villersexel
