= Neuchâtel Crisis =

1856-57 diplomatic crisis between Prussia and Switzerland

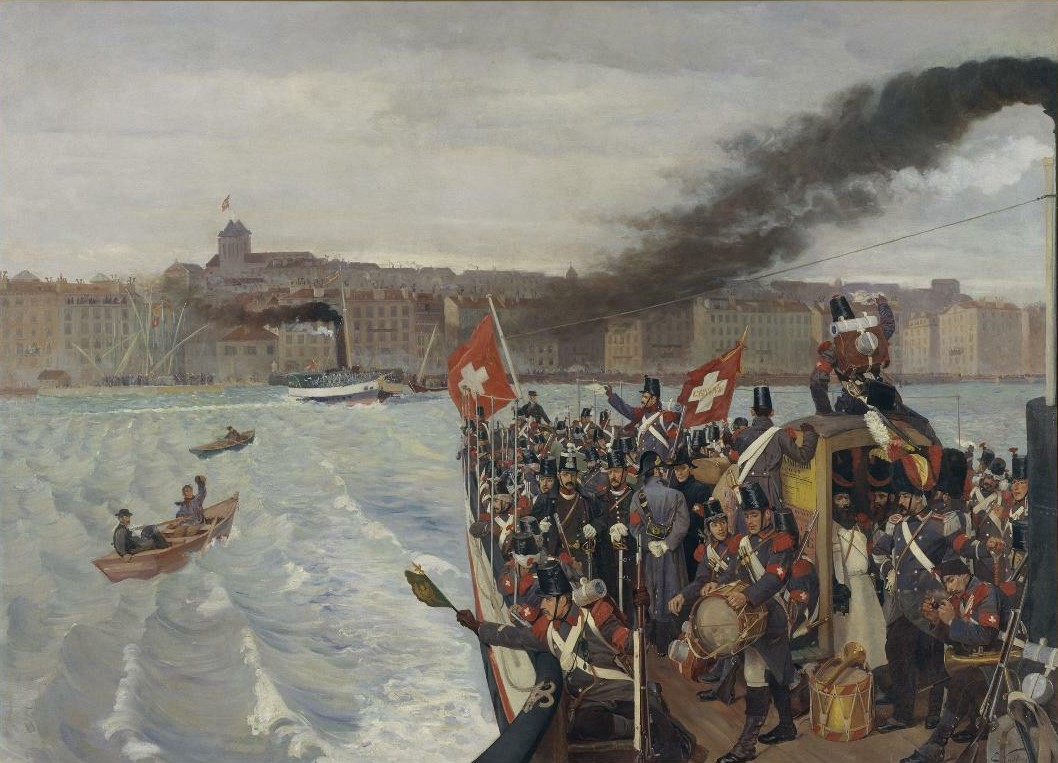
Departure of the Genevan troops, Rhine campaign by Édouard Castres, depicting the mobilization of the Swiss Army during the Neuchâtel Crisis.

The Neuchâtel Crisis or Neuchâtel Affair of 1856–1857 was a diplomatic crisis between Prussia and Switzerland regarding the rights of the king of Prussia to the Swiss canton of Neuchâtel.

== Background ==
Following the death of Marie de Nemours, Princess of Neuchâtel in 1707, the Principality of Neuchâtel was granted to the House of Hohenzollern, the royal dynasty of the Kingdom of Prussia. During the Napoleonic Wars, Napoleon deposed Frederick William III of Prussia as prince and awarded Neuchâtel to his long-time chief of staff, Marshal Louis-Alexandre Berthier, in 1806. Neuchâtel was returned to Frederick William in 1814, and the following year he agreed to allow the Principality to join the Swiss Confederation (which was then an alliance of semi-independent states rather than a single country) while remaining under his rule. Neuchâtel's dual status as both a Swiss canton and a Prussian principality was confirmed at the Congress of Vienna in 1815.

On 1 March 1848, amid a wave of revolutions in Europe, Neuchâtel republicans successfully revolted against Prussian rule, proclaimed the Republic and Canton of Neuchâtel and established a democratic government. In 1849, the Prussian government under King Frederick William IV began to press for recognition of their right to Neuchâtel. Several states proposed that Neuchâtel be separated from but remain allied with the Swiss Confederation. The British government sought to establish a diplomatic agreement, with the support of the French. Frederick William continued to press for his rights on the matter, and his claims were recognized by the European powers in the London Protocol of 1852.

== Crisis ==
Despite the success of the 1848 revolution, the situation in Neuchâtel remained tense as a strong royalist opposition, supported by Prussia, faced the new government. On the night of 2 to 3 September 1856, royalists occupied Neuchâtel Castle in attempt to restore control to the King of Prussia. The republican government, which had informed the Swiss Federal Council of the events, soon recaptured the castle and took about five hundred royalists prisoner. Switzerland sent federal councilors Constant Fornerod and Friedrich Frey-Herosé as commissioners to Neuchâtel, alongside investigating judge Charles Duplan. Invoking the Treaty of Vienna and the London Protocol, Frederick William demanded the immediate release of the prisoners. The Federal Council was only willing to accept on the condition that Frederick William renounced his claim to Neuchâtel, which he refused.

After unsuccessful French and British attempts at mediation, on 13 December 1856 Prussia severed diplomatic relations with Switzerland and scheduled the mobilization of its army for 1 January 1857. In response, the Swiss government prepared for war, mobilizing two divisions which were subsequently reinforced. Guillaume Henri Dufour, who had led the Swiss Army to victory in the Sonderbund War, was elected General by the Federal Assembly on 27 December, and Frey-Herosé was temporarily relieved of his duties as federal councilor on 30 December to join him as chief of staff. Dufour's planned defensive operation, named the "Rhine campaign", was based on the assumption that Prussia would occupy Swiss territories north of the Rhine, and included an advanced line of defense between the towns of Aach and Wutach in Baden. Prussian general Karl von der Gröben, however, had planned an advance on Bern.

The threat of war and mobilization led to a surge of patriotic fervor and calls for national unity within Switzerland. Nevertheless, on the request of Napoleon III, Prussia postponed its mobilization to 15 January, then cancelled it entirely after the French emperor obtained from the Federal Council the release, and expulsion from Switzerland, of all royalist prisoners. A conference was held in Paris in March 1857 between France, the United Kingdom, Prussia and Russia for the future of Neuchâtel, with the United Kingdom strongly supporting its independence. In a treaty signed on 26 May 1857, Frederick William finally yielded his claim to Neuchâtel at the insistence of the other powers. He remained nominally "Prince of Neuchâtel and Count of Valangin" until his death in 1861.

== See also ==
- Federal intervention in Switzerland
