= Édouard Castres =

Swiss painter

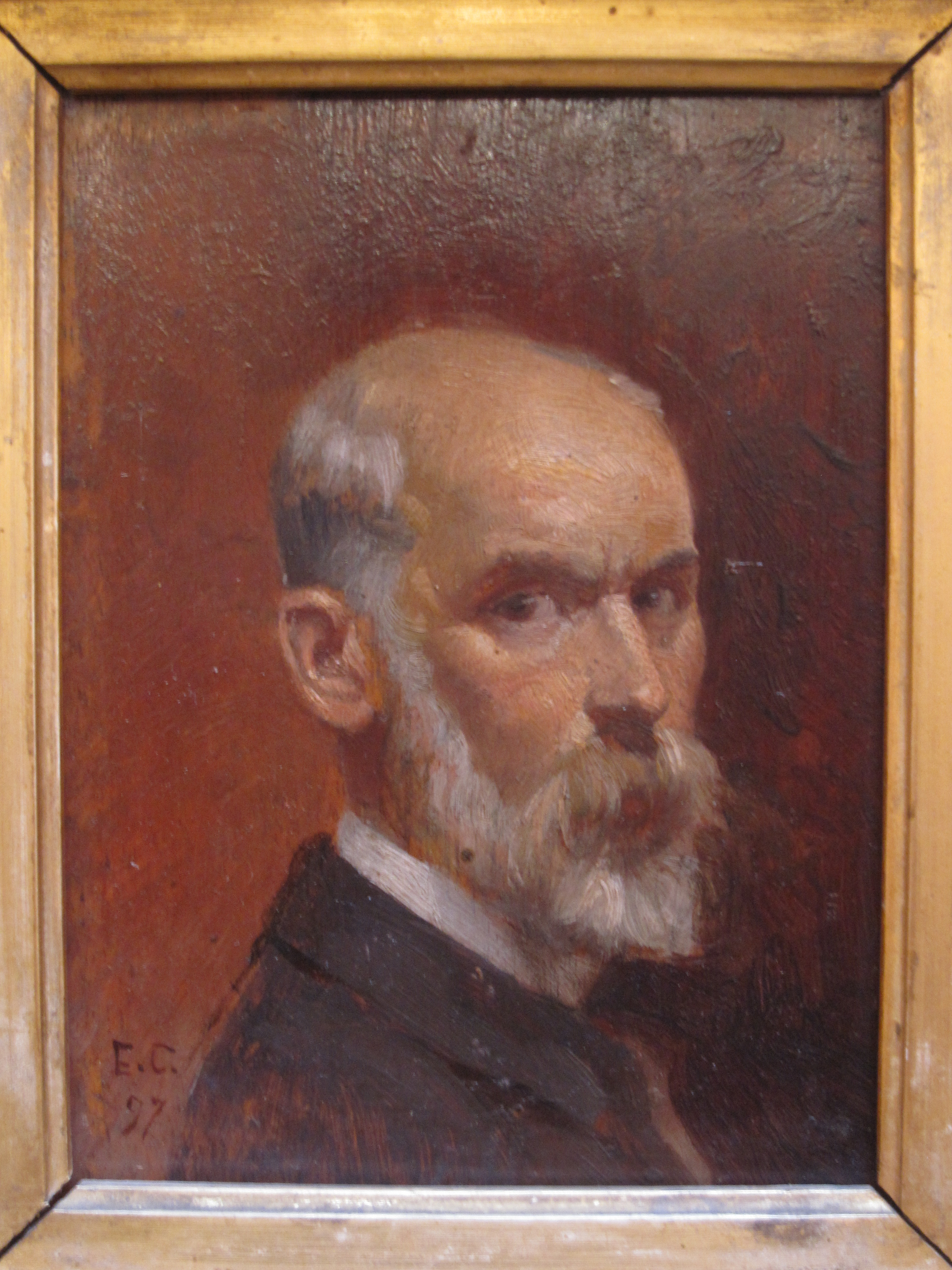
Self-portrait, 1897

Édouard Castres (Geneva, 21 June 1838 – Annemasse, 28 June 1902) was a Swiss painter.

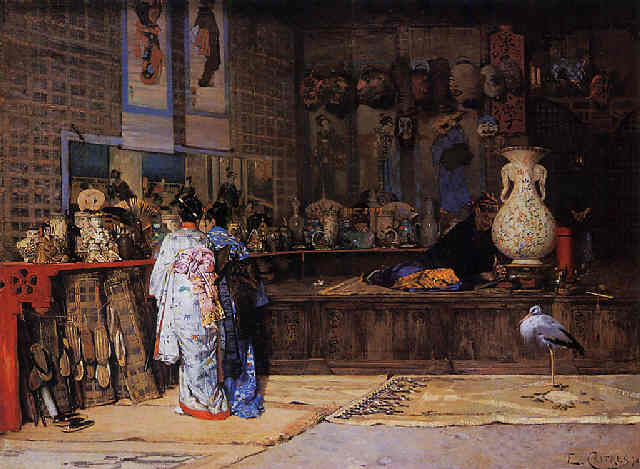
At the Japanese Market, 1870

Castres studied fine arts with Barthélemy Menn in Geneva before enrolling in the École des Beaux-Arts in Paris. He took part in the Franco-Prussian War of 1870/71 as a Red Cross volunteer accompanying General Bourbaki's Eastern Army throughout the last phase of the war. With collaborators he executed, in 1881, a large-scale panorama showing the withdrawal of Bourbaki's army into Switzerland and its internment. This Panorama is displayed in a rotunda in Lucerne.
