= Battle of the Lisaine =

Coordinates: 47.5°N 6.8°E

- Part of the Franco-Prussian War
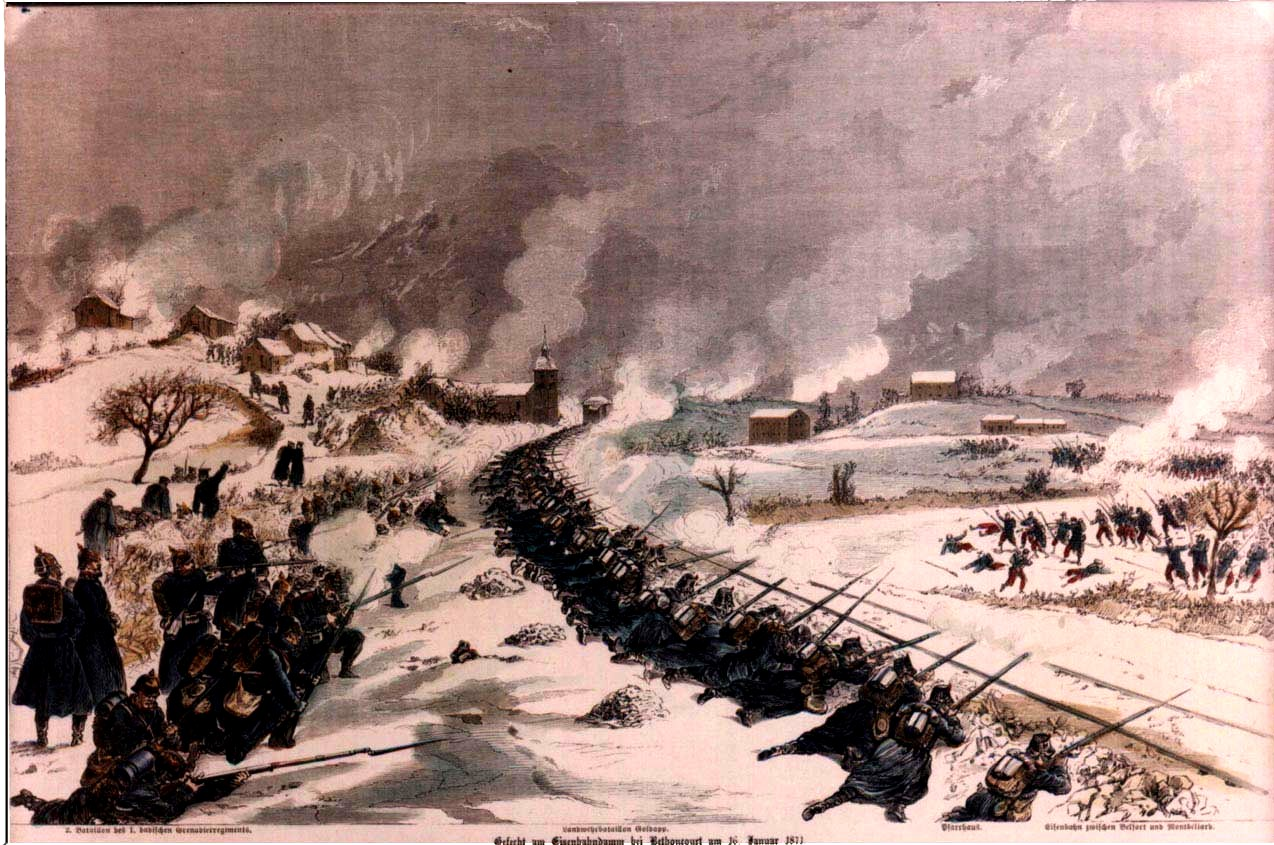
- Battle of the Lizaine by J.P Neri
Date	15–17 January 1871
Location	near Héricourt, Lizaine River, France
Result	German victory

Belligerents
North German Confederation: Prussia	French Republic

Commanders and leaders
August von Werder	Charles Denis Bourbaki

Units involved
XIV Corps	Armée de l'Est

Strength
40,000–45,000; 146 guns	110,000

Casualties and losses
1,800 killed or wounded 400 captured	4,000 killed or wounded 500 captured

The Battle of the Lisaine, also known as the Battle of Héricourt, was fought from 15 January to 17 January 1871 between German and French forces. The French were led by Charles Denis Bourbaki, and were attempting to relieve the Siege of Belfort. The Germans prepared XIV Corps (Baden) and several other divisions, some 40,000–45,000 men, to halt the French advance of about 110,000 men. The Germans had their outer posts overran quite swiftly but the Prussians forced back and counterattacked the French forces, breaking the morale of French troops and leaving them to either die or retreat. In the end their efforts failed, and they were forced to flee into Switzerland where they were all interned soon after.
