= General (Switzerland) =

Rank in the Swiss Armed Forces

General German: General French: Général Italian: Generale Romansh: Generale
- Dress uniform shoulder strap with the rank of General

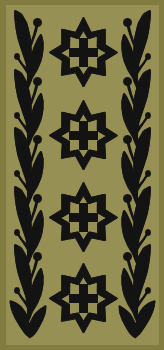
- Battledress rank insignia of General

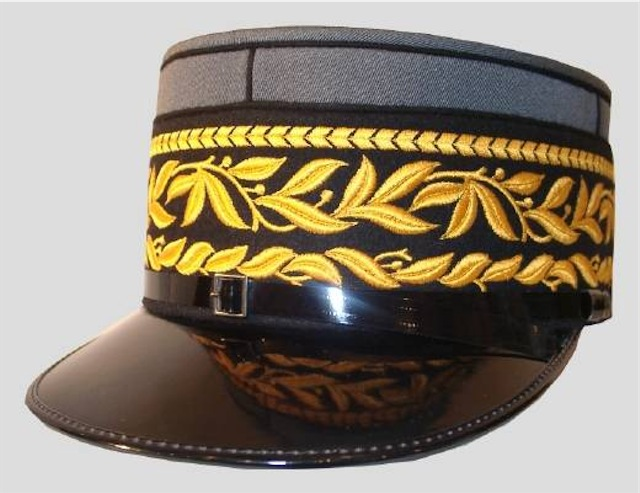
- Kepi of General
- Country: Switzerland
- Service branch: Swiss Army
- Abbreviation: GEN
- Rank group: General officer
- Rank: Four-star
- Non-NATO rank: OF-9
- Formation: 1512 as Old Swiss Confederacy; 1849 as Switzerland
- Next lower rank: Lieutenant general

The General (German: Der General, French: le général, Italian: il generale, Romansh: il general) is an office and rank in the armed forces of Switzerland. It is held by the commander-in-chief of the Army in time of war only. Under the Swiss Constitution, he must be elected by the Federal Assembly, assembled as the United Federal Assembly, specifically for the purpose of taking on the war-time responsibilities.

== Role ==
Outside of wartime, the rank of "General" is not used in the Swiss military. Indeed, none of the ranks of general officer contain the word "general". In peacetime, the Chief of the Swiss Armed Forces is granted the rank of Korpskommandant/Commandant de corps/Comandante di corpo (equivalent to Lieutenant-General).

The general is elected by a joint session of the Federal Assembly, known as the United Federal Assembly, wherein both the 200-seat National Council and 46-seat Council of States join together on a "one member, one vote" basis. The Federal Assembly retains the sole power to dismiss the General, but the General remains subordinate to the Federal Council by the Council's ability to demobilise and hence making the position of General redundant.

Swiss law does not establish the precise conditions when a General is to be elected, merely that the Federal Assembly may do so "as soon as an important number of troops are to be mobilised." The General is, however, permitted to adapt the internal structure of the Armed Forces in response to the strategic imperatives.

== History ==
Prior to the establishment of Switzerland as a federal state in 1848, Guillaume Henri Dufour was nominated by the Swiss Diet to serve as general in response to the invasion of Ticino during the Sonderbund War. As a consequence of that civil war, the structure of the Swiss Confederation was revised and a new constitution was promulgated in 1848, creating the modern Swiss government.

During the 1850s, Dufour was called upon three more times to serve as General on behalf of the entire federal government: in 1849 to prevent possible incursions into Swiss territory during the Baden Revolution; in 1856, to pre-empt Prussian military intervention in the Neuchâtel Crisis; and finally in 1859, to keep belligerents in the Franco-Austrian War from entering Switzerland. No other individual has held the position of general of the Swiss Armed Forces more often.

The Sonderbund War marked the last time that a General was nominated for Switzerland to assume command of forces directly involved in armed conflict. Since then, the Swiss Armed Forces have been mobilised to safeguard the integrity of Swiss territory in times of European conflict or crisis. Such was also the case for the Franco-Prussian War, the First World War and the Second World War. The mobilisation of the armed forces was a demonstration of the principle of "Armed Neutrality".

Nowadays, the general staff of the armed forces comprises officers with the ranks of Brigadier, Divisionär (Major General), Korpskommandant (Lieutenant General) and, although not currently held, General. The Chief of the Swiss Armed Forces is given the rank of Korpskommandant, which may be held by other senior officers as well.

A common misconception would hold that a Swiss "general" serves as the head of the Swiss delegation to the Neutral Nations Supervisory Commission at the DMZ on the Korean Peninsula. Although the head is addressed as Major General for the duration of his mandate, this is a courtesy translation of the rank designation of Divisionär, used within the Swiss Armed Forces.

== List of generals ==
The following Swiss officers have held the rank of General as the leaders of the Army in time of war:

Portrait	Name	Election	War	Ref.
	Guillaume Henri Dufour (1787–1875)	21 October 1847 (Note: Prior to the establishment of Switzerland as a federal state)	Sonderbund War	
	Guillaume Henri Dufour (1787–1875)	August 1849	Baden Revolution	
	Guillaume Henri Dufour (1787–1875)	27 December 1856	Neuchâtel Crisis	
	Guillaume Henri Dufour (1787–1875)	1859	Franco-Austrian War	
	Hans Herzog (1819–1894)	19 July 1870	Franco-Prussian War	
	Ulrich Wille (1848–1925)	8 August 1914	First World War	
	Henri Guisan (1874–1960)	30 August 1939	Second World War	
