= Justin Clinchant =

French general

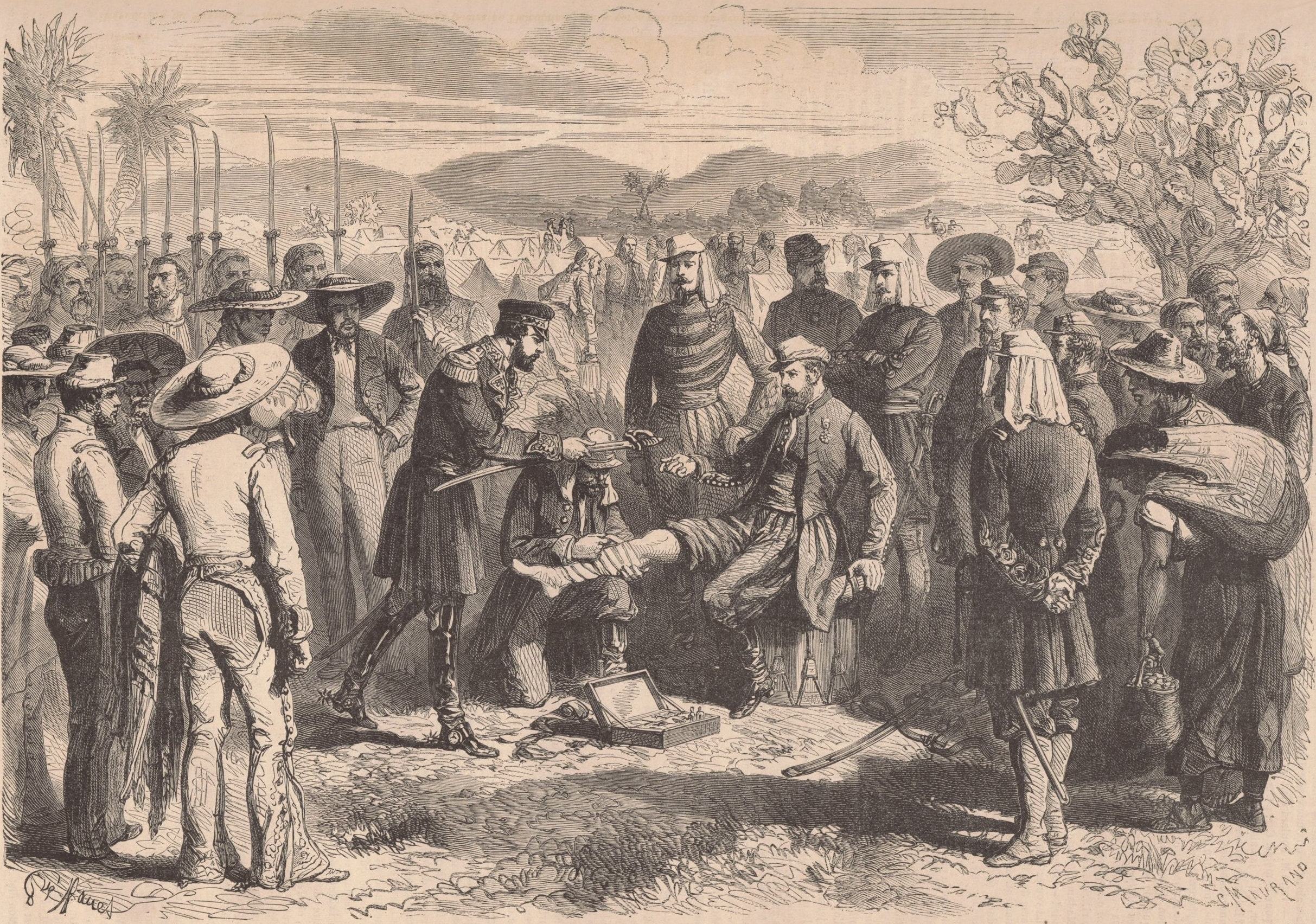
Victory of Jiquilpan, won by Colonel Clinchant, 2nd Zouaves, on general Juaristas Arteaga, Echegueray, Neri and Espinola. The latter gives his sword to Colonel Clinchant, who was shot in the leg.

Justin Clinchant (French pronunciation: [ʒystɛ̃ klɛ̃ʃɑ̃]; 24 December 1820, Thiaucourt-Regniéville – 20 March 1881) was a French Army general of the 19th century.

== Biography ==
Clinchant entered the army from St Cyr in 1841.

From 1847 to 1852 Clinchant was employed in the Algerian campaigns, and in 1854 and 1855 in the Crimea. At the assault on the Malakoff (8 September 1855) he greatly distinguished himself at the head of a battalion. During the 1859 campaign he won promotion to the rank of lieutenant-colonel, and as a colonel he served in the French intervention in Mexico. He was made general of brigade in 1866.

At the outbreak of the Franco-Prussian War in 1870, Clinchant led a brigade of the Army of the Rhine. His troops were amongst those shut up in Metz, and he passed into captivity, but soon escaped. The Government of National Defense made him general of division and put him at the head of the 20th corps of the Army of the East. He was under Bourbaki during the campaign of the Jura, and after Bourbaki attempted to commit suicide he succeeded to the command (23 January 1871). He was intercepted by the German Army under Von Manteuffel in an attempt at retreat, and thus driven with 84,000 men over the Swiss frontier at Pontarlier.

In 1871 Clinchant commanded the Fifth Army Corps of the Army of Versailles operating against the Commune. In 1879, he was appointed military governor of Paris. He held that position when he died in 1881.
