= Siege of Belfort =

1870–71 Franco-Prussian War siege

Coordinates: 47.6379°N 6.8628°E

- Part of the Franco-Prussian War
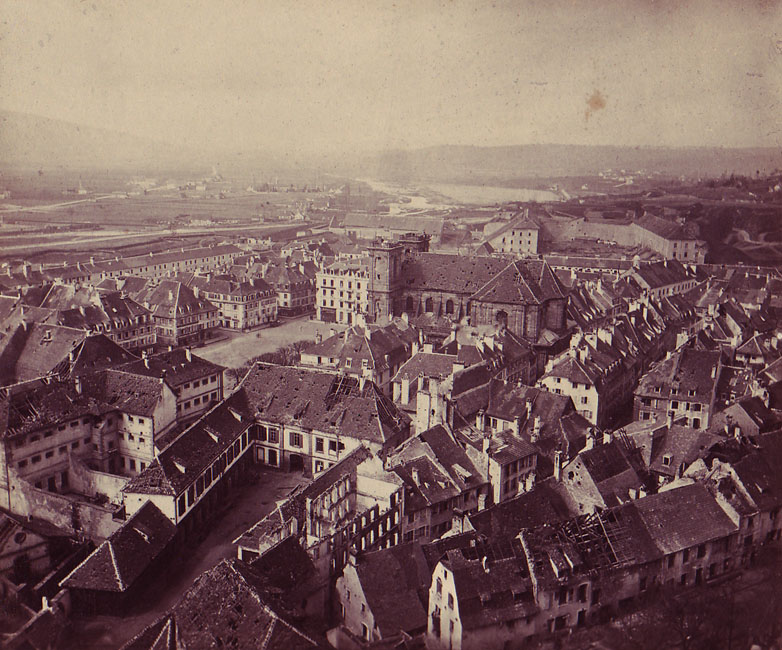
- Belfort after the siege
| Date | 3 November 1870 – 18 February 1871 |
| Location | Belfort, France |
| Result | Inconclusive; Germany fails to capture Belfort; France fails to break the encirclement |
| Territorial changes | Belfort is excluded from the French territorial concessions to Germany |

Belligerents
| North German Confederation: Prussia; Baden; Württemberg German Empire | French Republic |

Commanders and leaders
| August von Werder; Udo von Tresckow | (French Third Republic) Pierre Philippe Denfert-Rochereau |

Strength
| 26,000 | 18,000 (only 6,000 regulars) |

Casualties and losses
| 2,200 killed or wounded | 4,800 killed or wounded |

The siege of Belfort (3 November 1870 – 18 February 1871) was a 103-day military assault and blockade of the city of Belfort, France by Prussian forces during the Franco-Prussian War. The French garrison held out until the January 1871 armistice between France and the German Empire obligated French forces to abandon the stronghold in February 1871.

The Lion of Belfort monument by Frédéric Bartholdi which commemorates the Siege of Belfort.

Belfort is located in a gap between the mountainous southern Vosges and the Jura Massif, strategically positioned as the gateway between Alsace and central France. At the beginning of the war, the French Army of the Rhine was routed in northern Alsace. The fall of Strasbourg on 28 September 1870 allowed the German army under August von Werder to move south against Belfort. Upon hearing of the approaching German army, Pierre Philippe Denfert-Rochereau, commander of Belfort, began constructing fortifications around the city, expanding those originally built by Vauban. Werder's forces reached Belfort and invested the city on 3 November. The intransigent resistance by the French forces stopped the Germans from completing an effective encirclement of the city.

General Charles Denis Bourbaki assembled an army intending to relieve Belfort. On 15 January 1871 Bourbaki attacked Werder along the Lisaine River; however after a three-day battle he was repelled and his army retreated into Switzerland. German forces grew impatient with the length of the siege and on 27 January 1871, General von Tresckow launched an attack on the city which was repulsed and the siege operations resumed.

On 15 February an armistice was signed between France and Germany. Louis Adolphe Thiers, president of the Government of National Defense sent an urgent message to Denfert-Rochereau ordering him to surrender the fortress. On 18 February the Belfort garrison marched out of the city with the honours of war, taking their weapons and baggage train with them.

In recognition of the French defense of Belfort, under the terms of the Treaty of Frankfurt, the city and its surrounding area were not handed over to Germany, unlike the remainder of Alsace.

In 1880, the monumental Lion of Belfort sculpture was inaugurated in tribute to the defenders of the city.

== See also ==
- Fortified region of Belfort
