= Charles-Denis Bourbaki =

French soldier and officer (1816–1897)

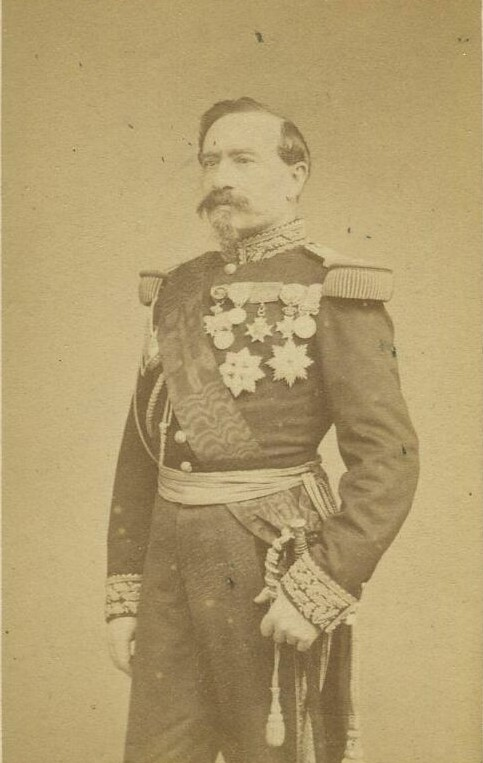
- General Bourbaki
- Born: 22 April 1816; Pau, France
- Died: 27 September 1897 (aged 81) (Note: The date of death has also been reported as 23 September.); Bayonne, France
- Military career
- Allegiance: July Monarchy; French Second Republic; Second French Empire; French Third Republic
- Branch: French Army
- Service years: 1834–1881
- Rank: Général de Division
- Commands: Army of the East
- Conflicts: Conquest of Algeria; Crimean War; Franco-Austrian War; Franco-Prussian War: Battle of Villersexel; Battle of the Lisaine
- Awards: Legion of Honour (Grand Croix)

Charles Denis Sauter Bourbaki (22 April 1816 – 22 September 1897) was a French general.

== Career ==
Bourbaki was born at Pau in extreme southwestern France, the son of Greek colonel Constantin Denis Bourbaki, who died in the Greek War of Independence in 1827. He was educated at the Prytanée National Militaire, entered École Spéciale Militaire de Saint-Cyr, and in 1836 joined the Zouaves (light infantry), becoming lieutenant of the Foreign Legion in 1838 and aide-de-camp to King Louis Philippe.

=== Early commands ===
It was in the African expedition that Bourbaki first came to the fore. In 1842 he was captain in the Zouaves; 1847, colonel of the Turcos; in 1850, lieutenant-colonel of the 1st Zouaves; 1851, colonel; 1854, brigadier-general. In the Crimean War he commanded a portion of the Algerian troops; and at the Alma, Inkerman and Sevastopol Bourbaki's name became famous.

In 1857 he was appointed general of division, placed in command in 1859 at Lyon. His success in the war in Italy was second only to that of MacMahon, and in 1862 he was proposed as a candidate for the vacant Greek throne, but declined the proffered honour.

=== Imperial Guard ===
In 1870 the Emperor Napoleon III entrusted Bourbaki with the command of the Imperial Guard, and he played an important part in the fighting around Metz. His conduct at the Battle of Gravelotte in August 1870 was questioned because, while the Prussians were exhausted from the fighting, and the French were poised to mount a counter-attack, Bourbaki refused to commit the reserves of the French Imperial Guard to the battle because he considered it a defeat.

A curious incident of the siege of Metz, during the Franco-Prussian War, is connected with Bourbaki's name. A certain Edmond Régnier, a French businessman with no political background or connections, appeared at Hastings on the 21 September to seek an interview with the refugee empress Eugénie, and failing to obtain this he managed to get from the young Prince Imperial a signed photograph with a message to the emperor Napoleon. This he used, by means of a safe-conduct from Bismarck, as credentials to Marshal Bazaine, to whom he presented himself at Metz, telling him on the empress's alleged authority that peace was about to be signed and that either Marshal Canrobert or General Bourbaki was to go to Hastings for the purpose.

Bourbaki at once went to England, with Prussian connivance, as though he had an official mission, only to discover from the empress at Hastings that a trick had been played on him. As soon as he could manage he returned to France but was refused re-entrance into Metz on a technicality, because his Prussian-provided passport was outdated by a few days.

=== Armée de l'Est ===
Bourbaki offered his services to Léon Gambetta, a lawyer and republican politician who had proclaimed the Third French Republic in September 1870. Bourbaki was given the command of the Northern Army, but was recalled on 10 November and transferred to the Army of the Loire. In command of the hastily trained and ill-equipped Army of the East, Bourbaki made an attempt to raise the siege of Belfort, which, after an initial victory in the Battle of Villersexel ended in the defeat of the French in the three-day battle of the Lisaine.

Other German forces under Prussian Field Marshal Edwin Freiherr von Manteuffel now closed upon Bourbaki, and he was eventually driven over the Swiss frontier with a remnant of his forces. His troops were in desperate condition, owing to lack of food; and out of 150,000 men under him when he started, only 87,000 men with 12,000 horses escaped into Switzerland. They crossed the western border of Switzerland at Les Verrières, Sainte-Croix, Vallorbe and in the Vallée de Joux at the beginning of February 1871. They were disarmed and detained for six weeks before being repatriated in March. This episode is memorialized in the Bourbaki Panorama, a large panoramic painting now in Lucerne, Switzerland.

Rather than submit to the humiliation of a probable surrender, Bourbaki had delegated his functions to General Justin Clinchant on 26 January 1871, and tried to commit suicide that night. He fired a pistol at his forehead, but the bullet somehow "flattened as if against a cast-iron plate" and his life was saved. General Clinchant carried Bourbaki into Switzerland, where he recovered sufficiently to return to France.

In July 1871, he again took the command at Lyon where he subsequently became military governor.

=== Later service ===
In 1881, owing to his political opinions, he was placed on the retired list. In 1885 he was an unsuccessful candidate for the French Senate. He died in Bayonne.

The Bourbaki group of 20th century French mathematicians adopted his surname as a collective pseudonym.
