= Musée Bartholdi =

Art museum in France

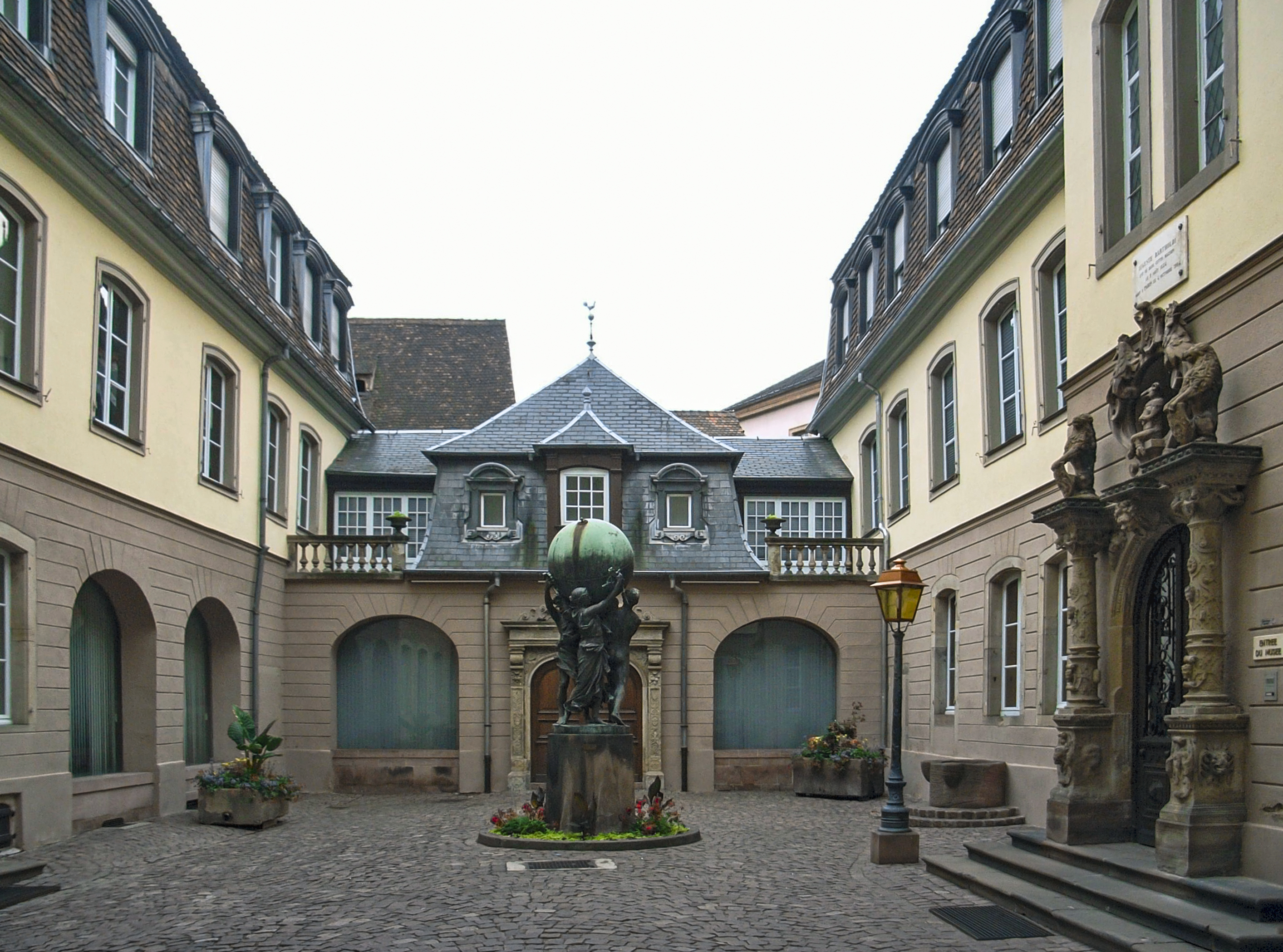
- Courtyard of the museum, with the Statue des grands soutiens du monde in the center
- Location: 30 rue des Marchands; 68000 Colmar, France
- Coordinates: 48.076685°N 7.357726°E
- Type: Art museum
- Visitors: 16,029
- Website: www.musee-bartholdi.com

The Musée Bartholdi is a museum dedicated to French sculptor Auguste Bartholdi and is situated at 30 rue des Marchands in Colmar, at the artist's birthplace. The museum has the "Musée de France" label. In 2011, the building was labeled "Maisons des Illustres" by the Ministry of Culture and Communication. In the courtyard there is a statue named Statue des grands soutiens du monde. Two doors of the 17th century were registered as a monument historique on 18 June 1926. In 2012, the museum had over 16,000 visitors.

== Museum building ==
The museum is at 30, rue des Marchands in Colmar, the birthplace of Auguste Bartholdi. The town house is from the eighteenth century but two Renaissance arcades discovered during restoration work evidences older buildings on the site. At the end of the eighteenth century the house was owned by the family of Etienne Meyer whose daughter Catherine Dorothée married Dr. Jean Charles Bartholdi (1756–1830); their son Jean Charles (1791–1836) was the father of Auguste Bartholdi. On 25 June 1907, the house was bequeathed to the town of Colmar by Auguste Bartholdi's widow on condition it was made into a museum. Madame Bartholdi died in 1914 but the First World War delayed the setting up of the museum until Alsace was returned to France from Germany.

The two 17th-century gates were listed on the additional inventory of historical monuments by order of June 18, 1929.

== Works exhibited ==
The museum, inaugurated on 18 November 1922, preserves a collection of sculptures, paintings, drawings, photographs of sketches and models. It houses on three levels the space dedicated to this emblematic 19th century artist for having created Liberty Enlightening the World and the Lion of Belfort. Among many other, works by Bartholdi that can be seen in the museum include:

- preparatory models for monuments created by the sculptor in the city, namely the statue of General Rapp, the Roesselmann fountain, the Hirn monument, the Schwendi fountain, the statue of Martin Schongauer, the statue of Admiral Bruat, the statue of the small grower and the statue of Alsacian Cooper;
- preparatory models for the Lion of Belfort;
- the Martyr moderne symbolizing the ultimate patriotic uprising by Poland against the Russian tsars (allegory of the myth of Prometheus);
- a preparatory model of an ear of Liberty Enlightening the World, commonly known as the Statue of Liberty
- a preparatory model of a horse's head for the Fontaine Bartholdi;
- a collection of objects referring to the presence of a Jewish community in Alsace that has been well established for centuries.

In the courtyard stands Bartholdi's bronze sculpture Les Grands Soutiens du Monde, created in 1889. It was exhibited at the 1902 Salon des Artistes Français and takes the form of two male figures representing work and patriotism and a female figure representing justice supporting a globe.

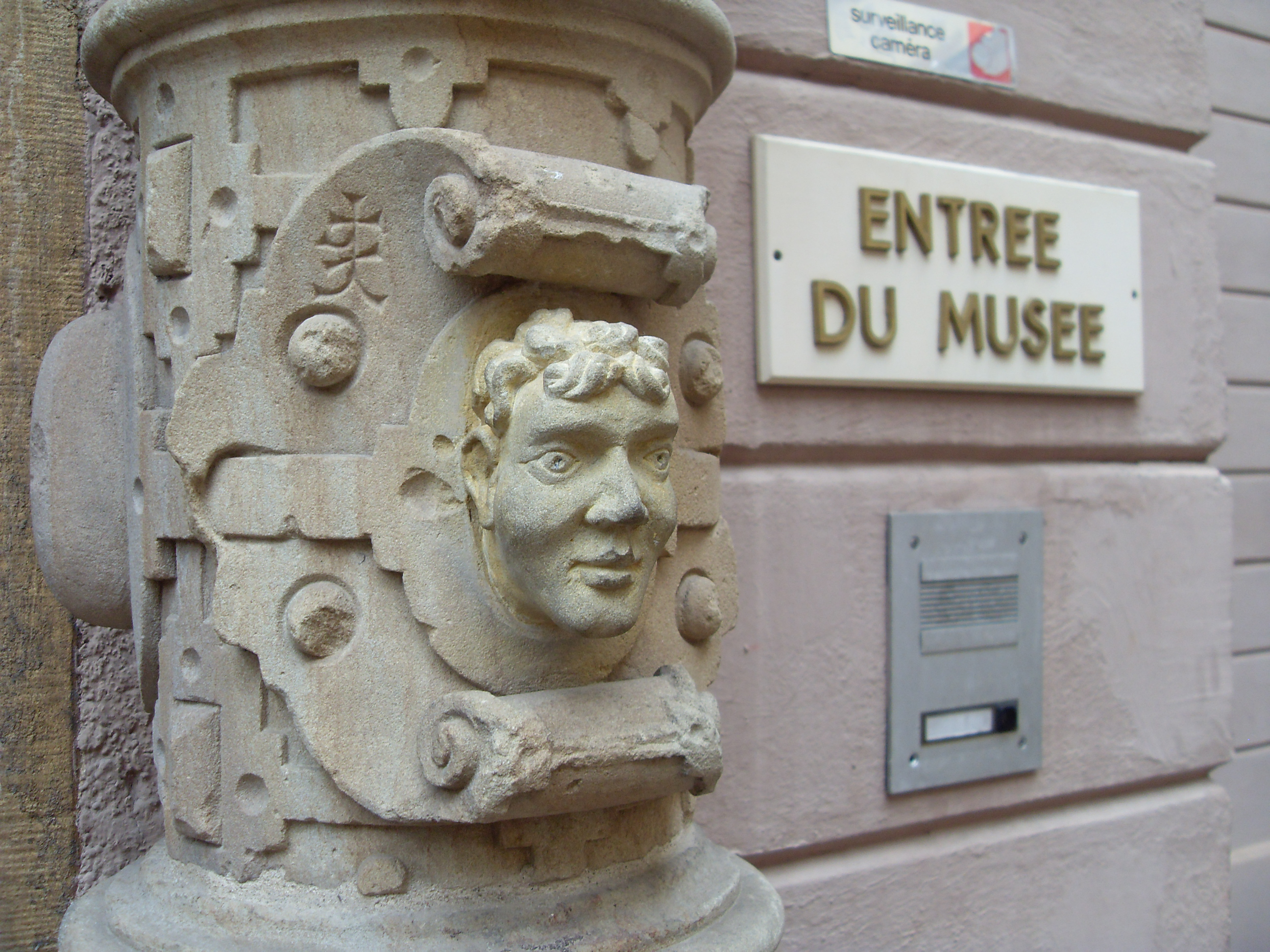
Entrance of the museum

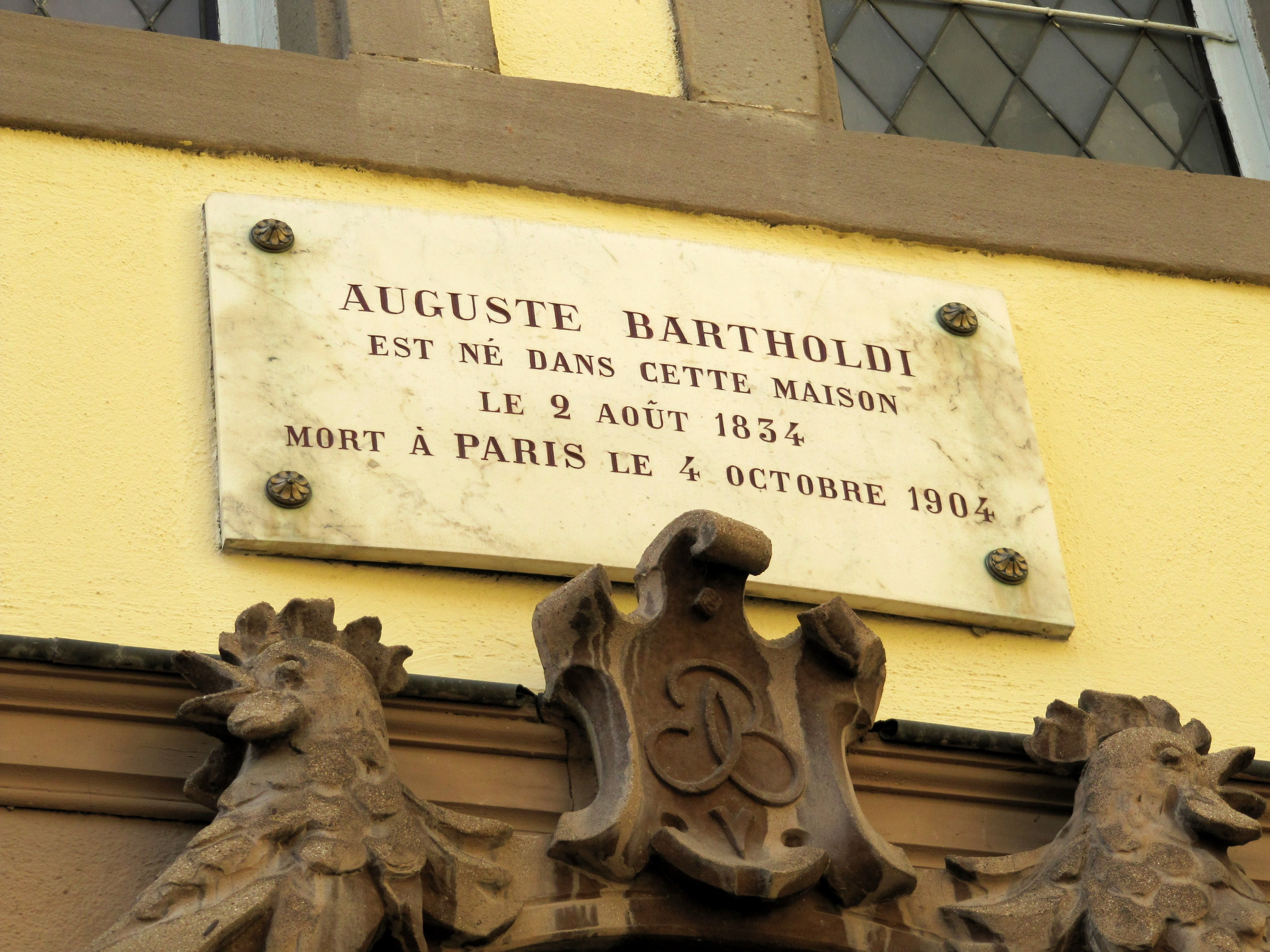
Plaque indicating that Bartholdi was born here

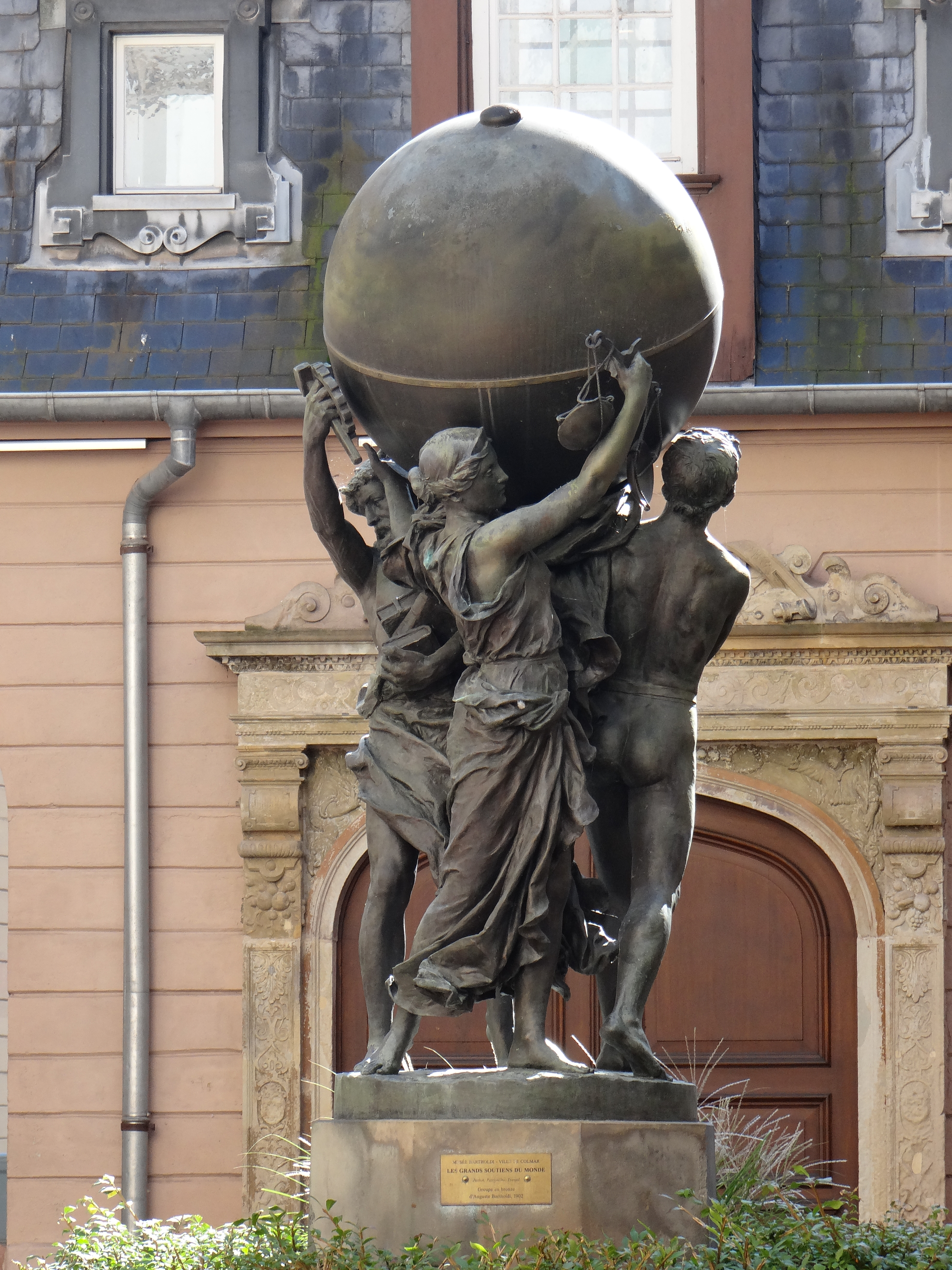
Les Grands Soutiens du Monde

== In popular culture ==
The museum is featured in the 2019 documentary about Bartholdi and the Statue of Liberty, Liberty: Mother of Exiles.

== See also ==
- List of single-artist museums
- Statue of Liberty Museum
