= Strassburger memorial =

Monument in Basel

Coordinates: 47°32′56″N 7°35′27″E

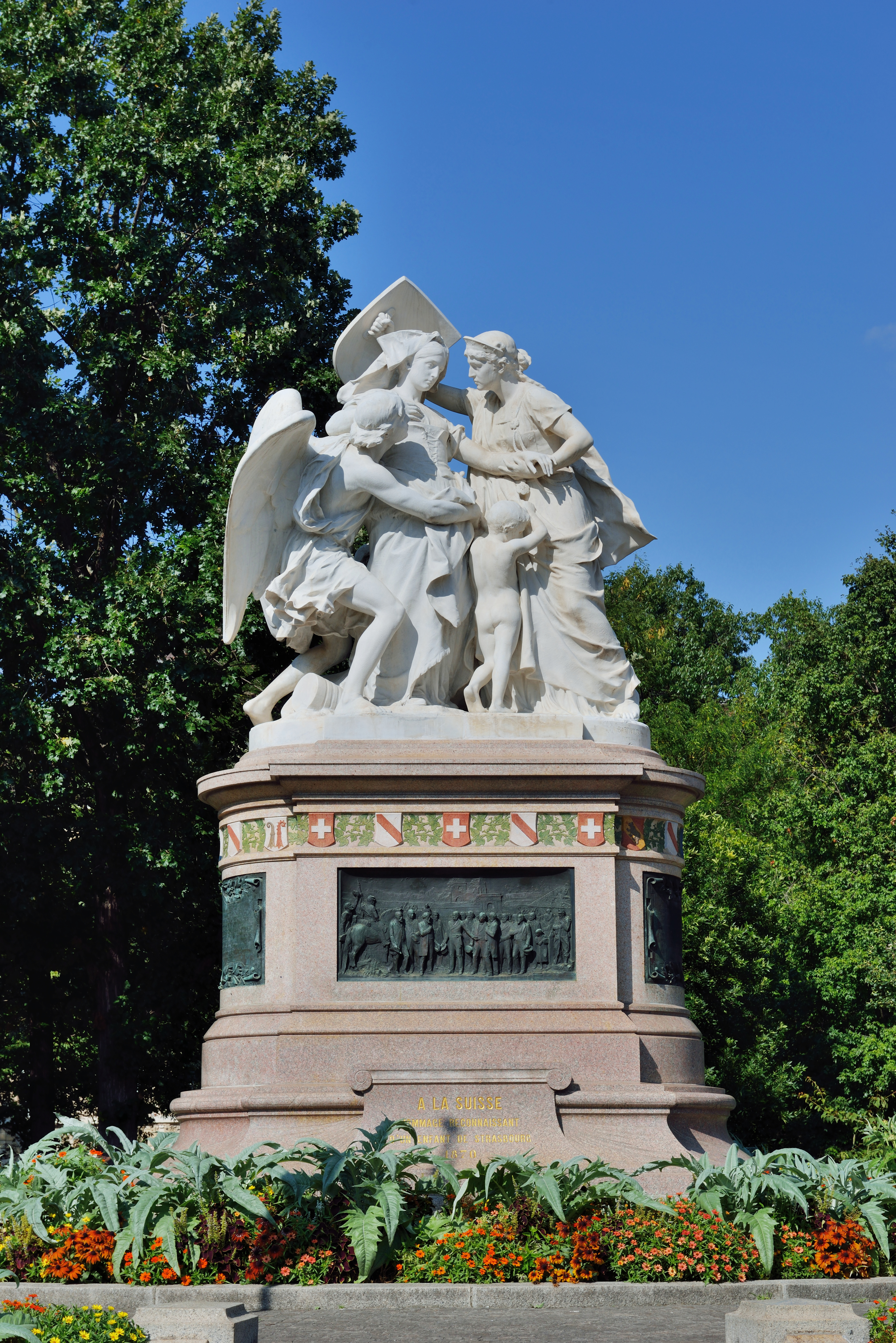
The Strassburger memorial

The Strassburger memorial is a monument in Basel established in memory of the help the civil population of Strassburg received from Switzerland during the Franco-Prussian war in 1870–1871. It was modeled by Frédéric Auguste Bartholdi and is located in a park across from the Basel SBB railway station.

== Background ==
As in August 1870 the Prussian General August Leopold Karl Wilhelm von Werder (1808–1887) ordered the artillery to target the city of Strasbourg, it caused politicians from nearby Basel to assist the civilian victims. An auxiliary committee was set up and met in Basel on 4 September 1870 other associations with the same goals also met in Bern and Zurich. The three committees joined forces in their aim to help the civilians in Strassburg. On 8 September, the mayors of Bern Otto von Büren, and Zürich, Dr. Melchior Römer went to Strasbourg with the support of the Swiss Federal Council. At the German headquarters, they successfully presented their request to General von Werder. In the weeks after 15 September the Swiss delegation managed to get almost 1,800 civilians out of the embattled city.

== Realization of the statue ==
After about twenty years after the war, the Alsatian Baron Gilbert Hervé-Gruyer, who had settled to Montpellier, asked the Federal Council for the permission to build a memorial in order to commemorate the relief effort. The Federal Council approved such an idea determining Basel as the appropriate location for the monument. Baron Hervé-Gruyer managed to compel the sculptor Bartholdi for his project and Carrara marble was chosen as the stone for the monument. The sculpture depicts the spirit of Strasbourg (left) who hands over the war-ravaged city (center) to the care of Helvetia (right). The crying child represents the suffering of the population. On the pedestal, a relief depicting the arrival of the Swiss delegation in Strasbourg was shown at the front and on the backside the early relations between the two cities Zurich and Strasbourg were symbolized with a boat ride from 1576 from Zurich to Strasbourg, with which Zurich assured Strasbourg of their capability of assistance. In 1891, Bartholdi presented a model of his monument for Basel to the Federal Council and was subsequently approved. In early 1895, he introduced a model of the statue to the Salon de Paris and it received an award. The erected monument could be inaugurated on 20 October 1895 at his current location near the main train station in Basel. Baron Hervé-Gruyer was not able to be present to the inauguration as he had died. In his place, his adoptive son took part together with Bartholdi.

=== Restoration in 2014 ===
After more than a hundred years, the statue was restored and protected with a thin layer of limestone.

== Gallery ==
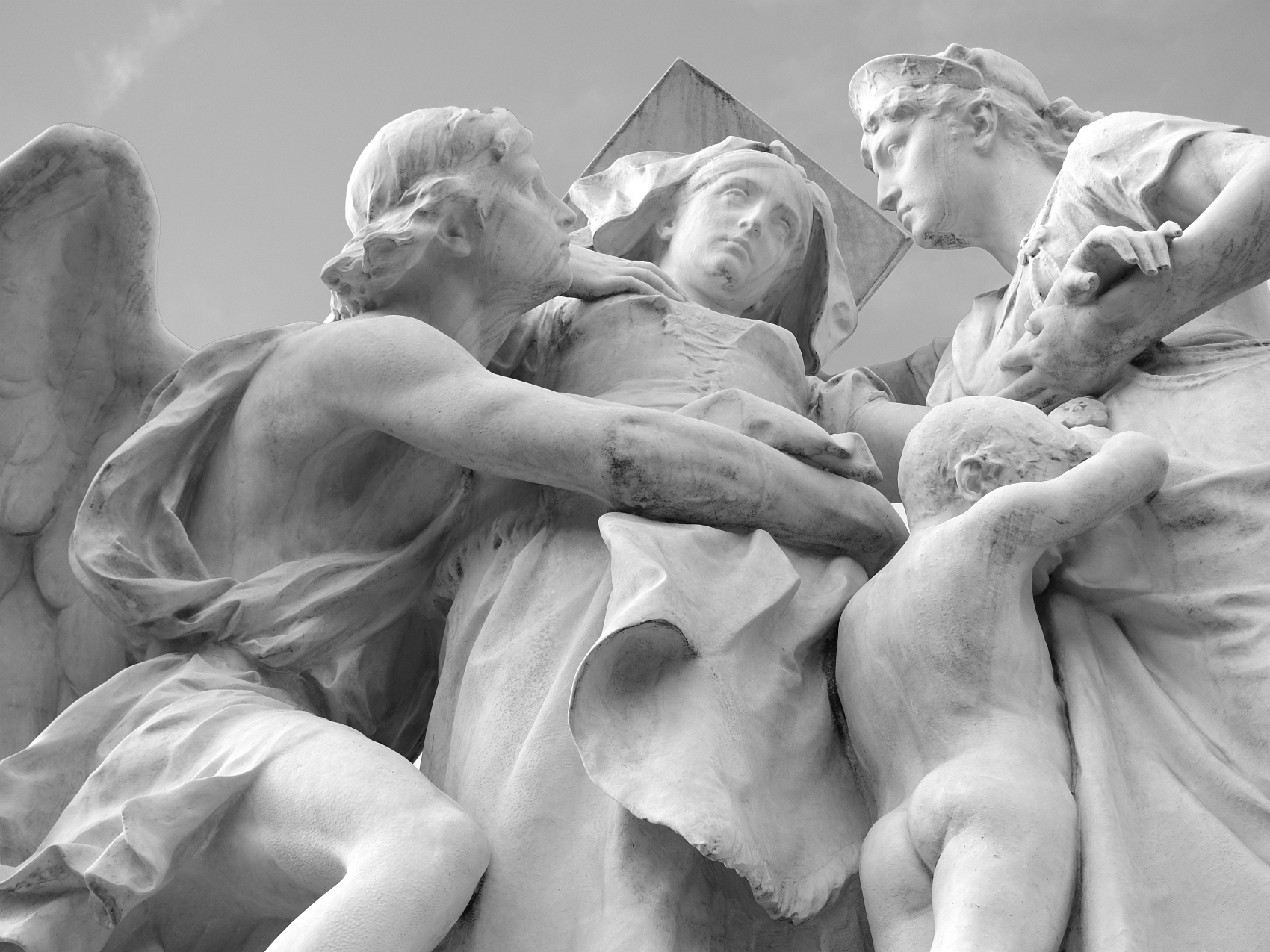
Close up of the statue

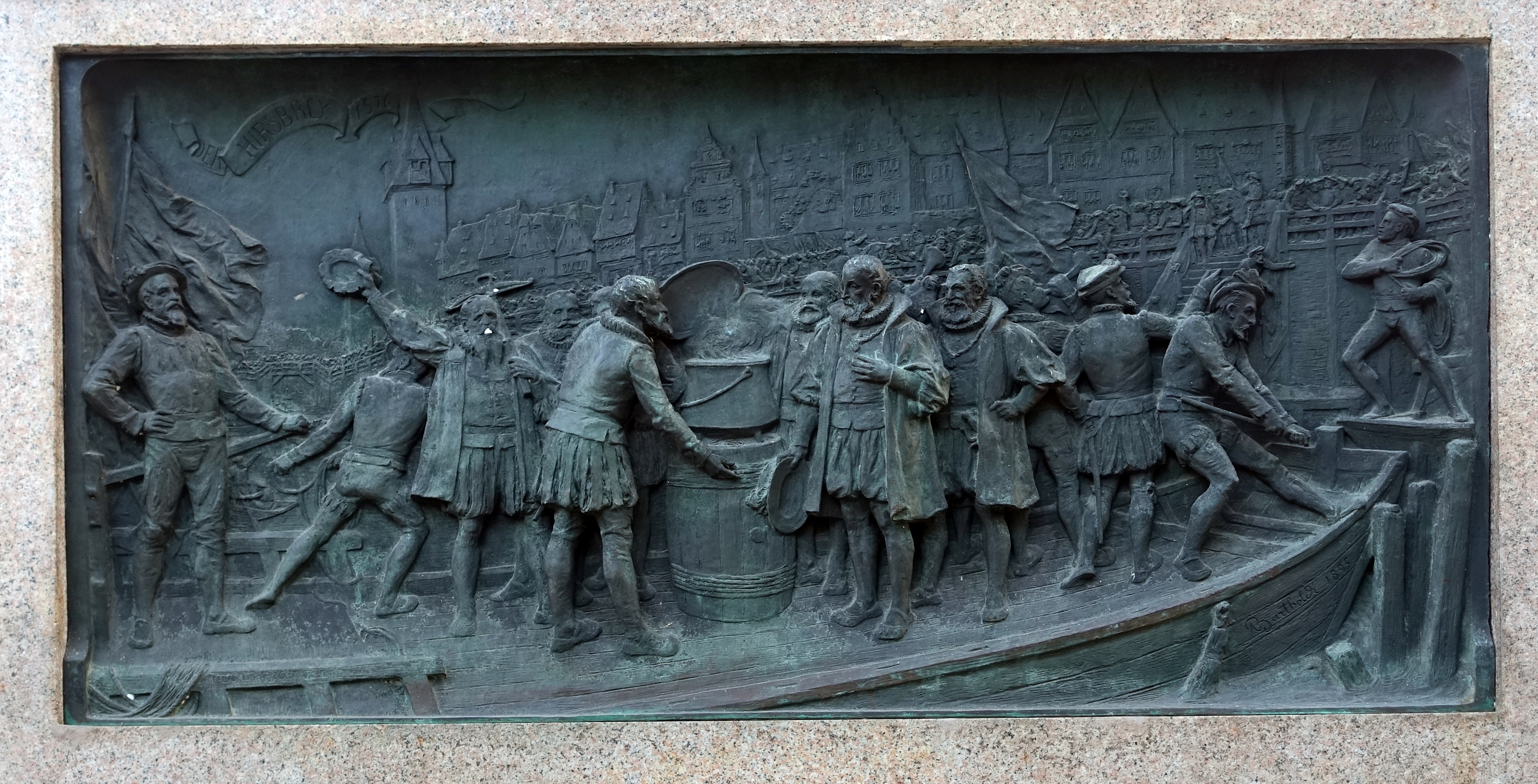
Relief on the pedestal

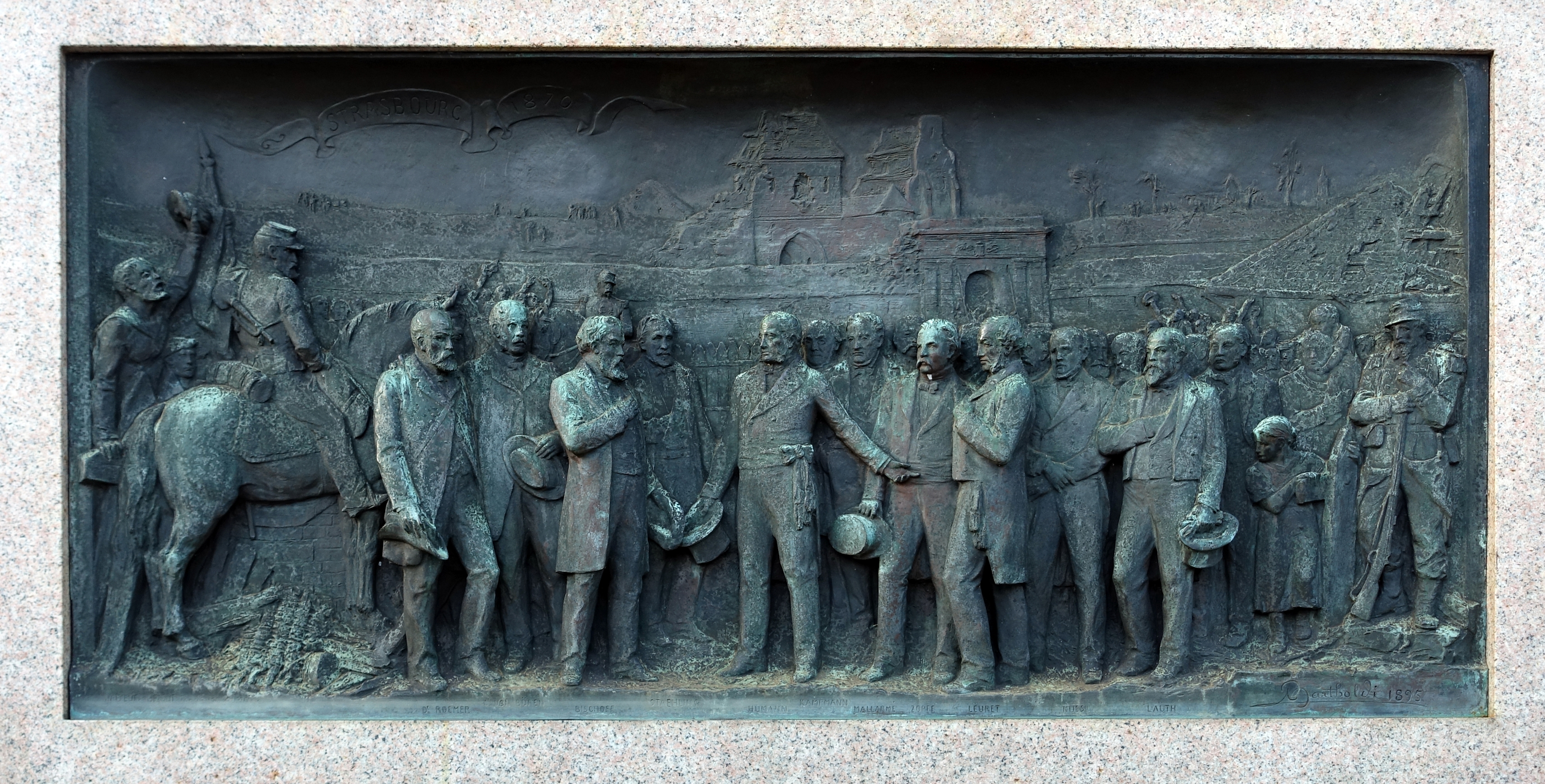
Relief on the pedestal
