= Pierre Philippe Denfert-Rochereau =

French serviceman and politician

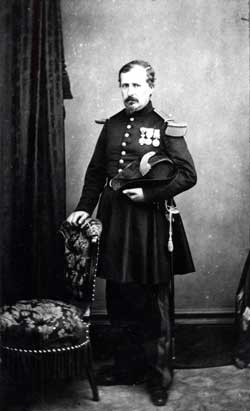
- Born: 11 January 1823; Saint-Maixent-l'École, France
- Died: 11 May 1878 (aged 55); Versailles, France
- Military career
- Allegiance: Kingdom of France; French Second Republic; Second French Empire; French Third Republic
- Branch: French Army
- Rank: Colonel
- Nickname: The Lion of Belfort
- Conflicts: Crimean War; Franco-Austrian War; Franco-Prussian War
- Awards: Commander of the Légion d'honneur

Pierre Philippe Marie Aristide Denfert-Rochereau, (French pronunciation: [pjɛʁ filip maʁi aʁistid dɑ̃fɛʁ ʁɔʃʁo]; 11 January 1823 – 11 May 1878), was a French serviceman and politician. He achieved fame by successfully defending besieged Belfort during the Franco-Prussian War: this earned him the sobriquet The Lion of Belfort (French: le lion de Belfort).

== Biography ==
Born in an upper-class, aristocratic Protestant family, he married a daughter of a leading Montbéliard family, Pauline Surleau-Goguel.

Denfert-Rochereau graduated from École Polytechnique in 1842. He distinguished himself during the French expedition in Rome in 1849, and participated in the Crimean War in 1855, where he was wounded at the taking of Malakoff. He was then sent to French Algeria from 1860 to 1864.

=== Siege of Belfort ===
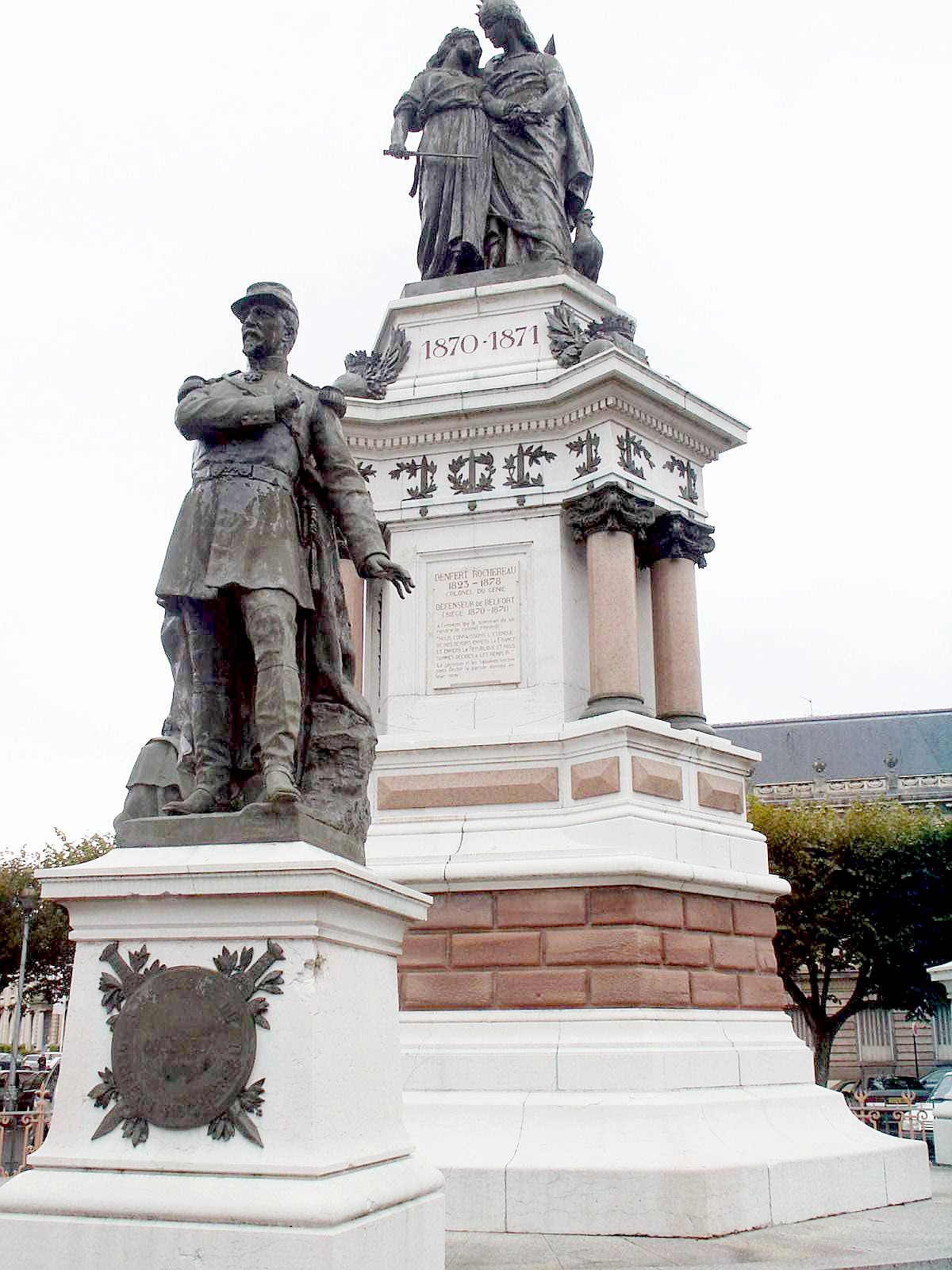
Statue of colonel Denfert-Rochereau in Belfort.

Appointed commander of Belfort in 1870, Colonel Denfert-Rochereau was confronted from November 1870 with the attack and the subsequent siege of the city by the German armies under August von Werder. When asked to surrender the fortress, the Colonel responded: "We are aware of our duty towards France and the Republic, and are resolved to respect it". Refusing to permit the evacuation of the civilian population, in December 1870 the Germans started to shell the city.

Denfert-Rochereau then led with his garrison of 15,000 men (of which only 3,500 were actual soldiers) and the city's population a 103 days resistance against the 40,000 soldiers of Werder. The heroic resistance would eventually end only under the order of the Government of National Defense on the 18 February 1871: Denfert-Rochereau accepted to leave the stronghold with his troops and arms, freely and unconquered, avoiding the humiliation of a defeat.

Refusing the armistice, he urged (de facto) President Thiers to pardon the young officer Louis Rossel—also a Protestant— who had joined the Paris Commune after the French defeat. Rossel was nevertheless executed on 27 November 1871.

The resistance of Denfert-Rochereau saved the honour of France, otherwise humiliated by MacMahon's defeat at Sedan and Bazaine' surrender at Metz. It also allowed Thiers to negotiate retention of the Belfort region which thereby was separated from the rest of German annexed-Alsace.

=== In politics ===
A national hero, Denfert-Rochereau was elected to the National Assembly as a Member of Parliament (député). There he supported Léon Gambetta's policies. He died in Versailles in 1878, and was buried near his spouse in the Montbéliard Cemetery.

== Legacy ==
The Place Denfert-Rochereau in Paris (14th arrondissement of Paris) was named after him in 1879, as well as other streets and places across France.

== Sources ==
- Adolphe Robert, Gaston Cougny (1889–1891). Dictionnaire des parlementaires français de 1789 à 1889. Edgard Bourloton.
- Biography (in French) of Denfert-Rochereau on the Assemblée Nationale (French Parliament)'s website:
