= Statue of Liberty Museum =

Museum on Liberty Island in New York City

Coordinates: 40.690058°N 74.046201°W

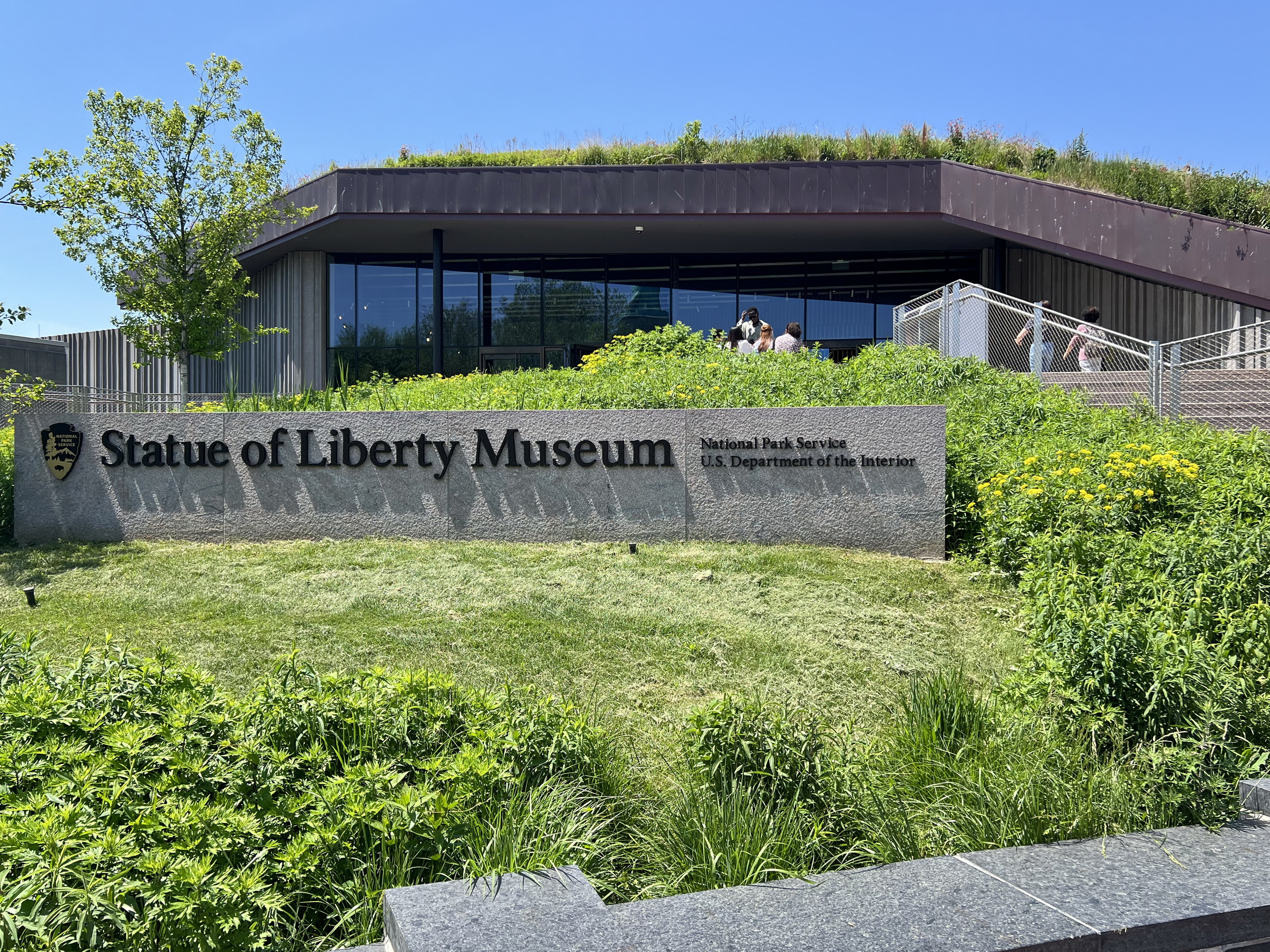
The Statue of Liberty Museum

The Statue of Liberty Museum is located on Liberty Island in New York City. The museum opened on May 16, 2019, and is focused on the creation, meaning, and history of the Statue of Liberty (formally Liberty Enlightening the World), a large statue by Frédéric Auguste Bartholdi which the people of France gave to the people of the United States in 1886.

== Exhibits ==
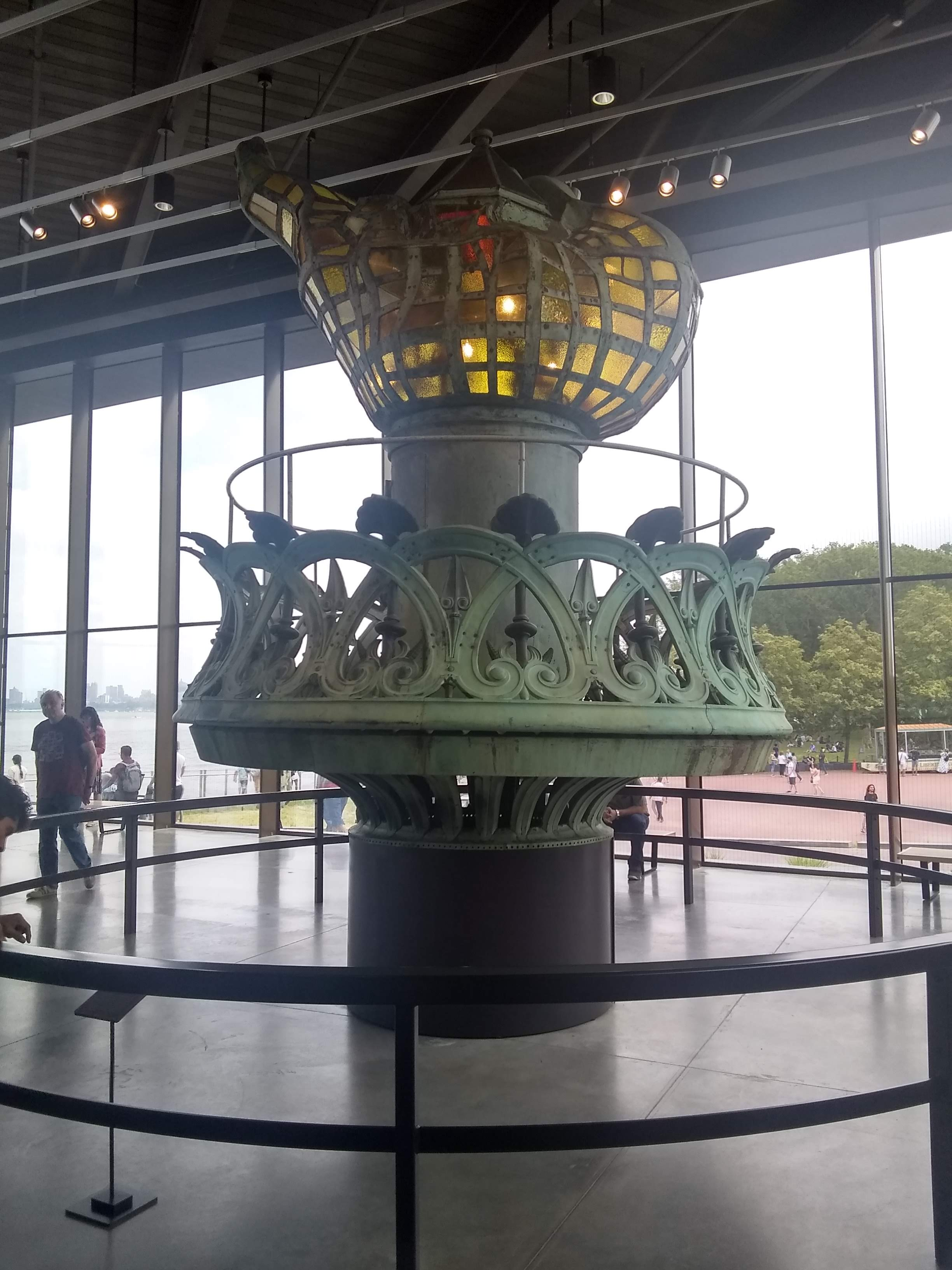
The original torch carried by Liberty from 1886 to 1984

The original torch, carried by Liberty from 1886 to 1984, is located in the museum. The museum includes exhibits relating to the statue's construction and history, and a theater where visitors can watch an aerial view of the statue. The exhibits include more than 500 photographs and graphics from more than 100 different sources. Examples include rare historic photos of the statue's construction from the Musée Bartholdi in Colmar, France, and sketches of early designs for the pedestal from the Library of Congress. The exhibition was designed by Edwin Schlossberg’s New York firm ESI Design.

== Funding ==
The museum was funded privately by Diane von Fürstenberg, Michael Bloomberg, Jeff Bezos, Coca-Cola, NBCUniversal, the family of Laurence Tisch and Preston Robert Tisch, and Mellody Hobson and George Lucas. Von Fürstenberg headed the fundraising for the museum, and the project raised more than $40 million in fundraising as of its October 6, 2016, groundbreaking.

== Construction ==
Construction of the new Statue of Liberty Museum started in early October 2016. The $70 million 26,000-square-foot (2,400 m^{2}) museum can accommodate all of the island's daily visitors, while the former museum could hold only 20 percent. The museum was designed by FXCollaborative and is integrated with the parkland around it. Upon the museum's opening, third-party commercial tour guides were banned from certain parts of the island, including part of the museum.

== In media ==
The construction of the museum, and Diane von Furstenberg's role in its funding, are featured in the 2019 documentary Liberty: Mother of Exiles.

== Gallery ==
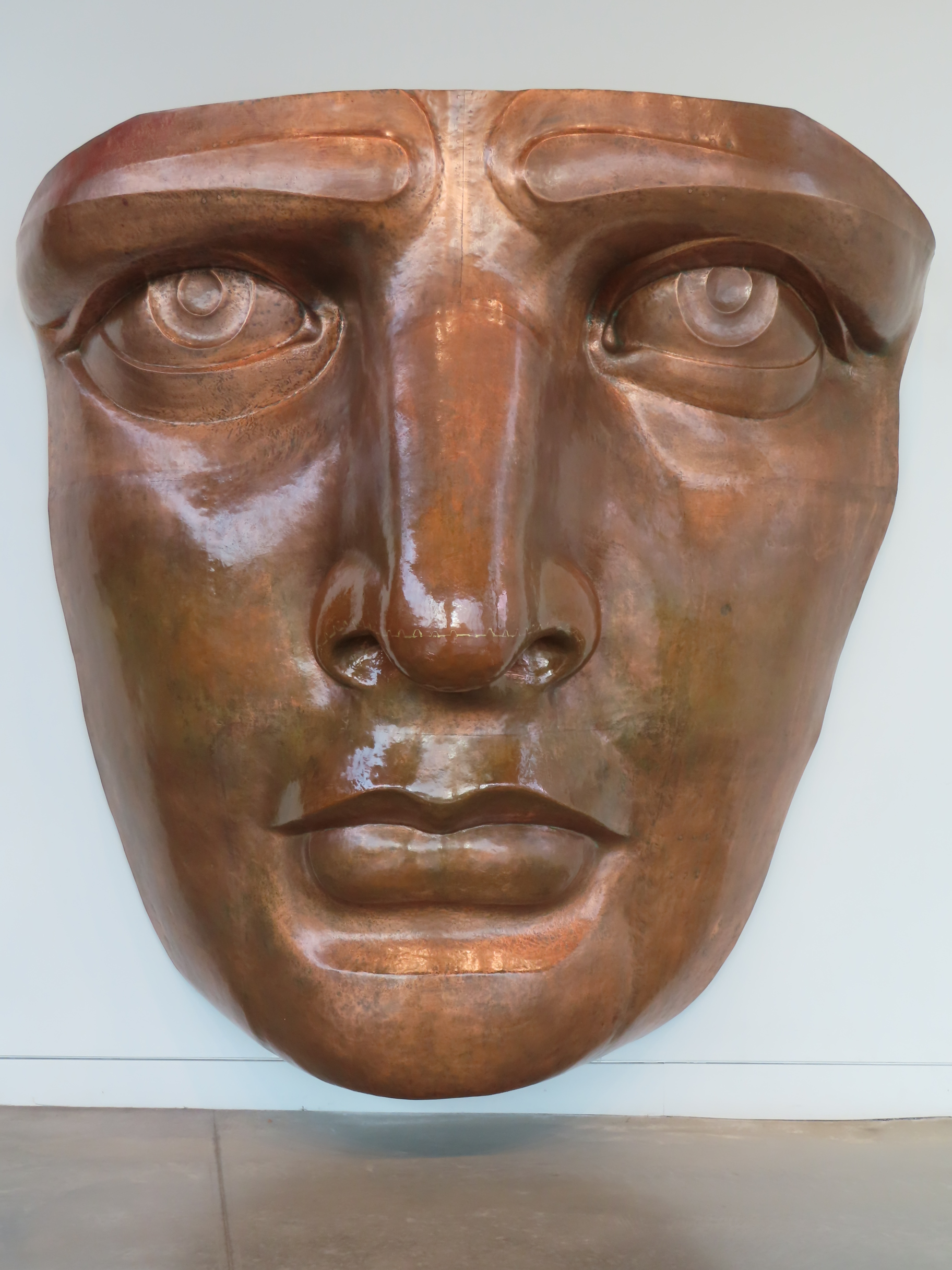
Face mold of the Statue of Liberty

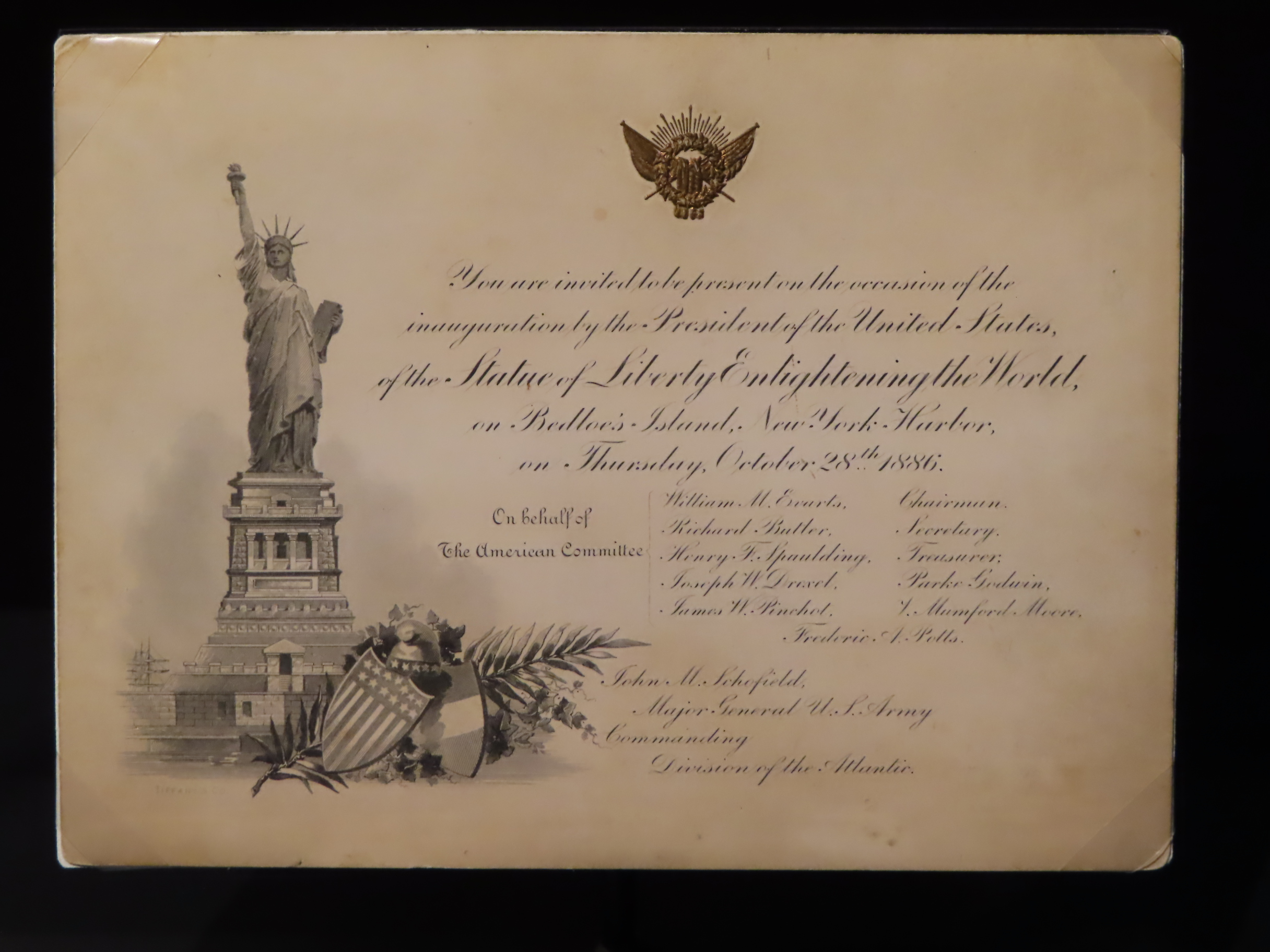
Invitation to the 1886 dedication ceremony for the statue Liberty Enlightening the World

== See also ==
- List of single-artist museums
- Musée Bartholdi
