= Paul de Rémusat =

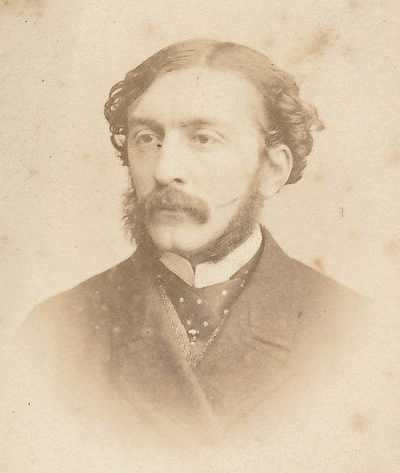
Paul de Rémusat, French journalist and politician (1831–1897)

Paul de Rémusat (French: [pɔl də ʁemyza]; 17 November 1831, Paris – 22 January 1897, Paris), son of the French politician Charles de Rémusat, became a distinguished journalist and writer.

He was for many years a regular contributor to the Revue des deux Mondes. He stood for election in Haute-Garonne in 1869 in opposition to the imperial policy and failed, but was elected to the National Assembly in 1871 and later. In 1890 he entered the Académie des Sciences Morales et Politiques.
