= Lion of Belfort =

Monumental sculpture in France

Coordinates: 47°38′12″N 6°51′53″E

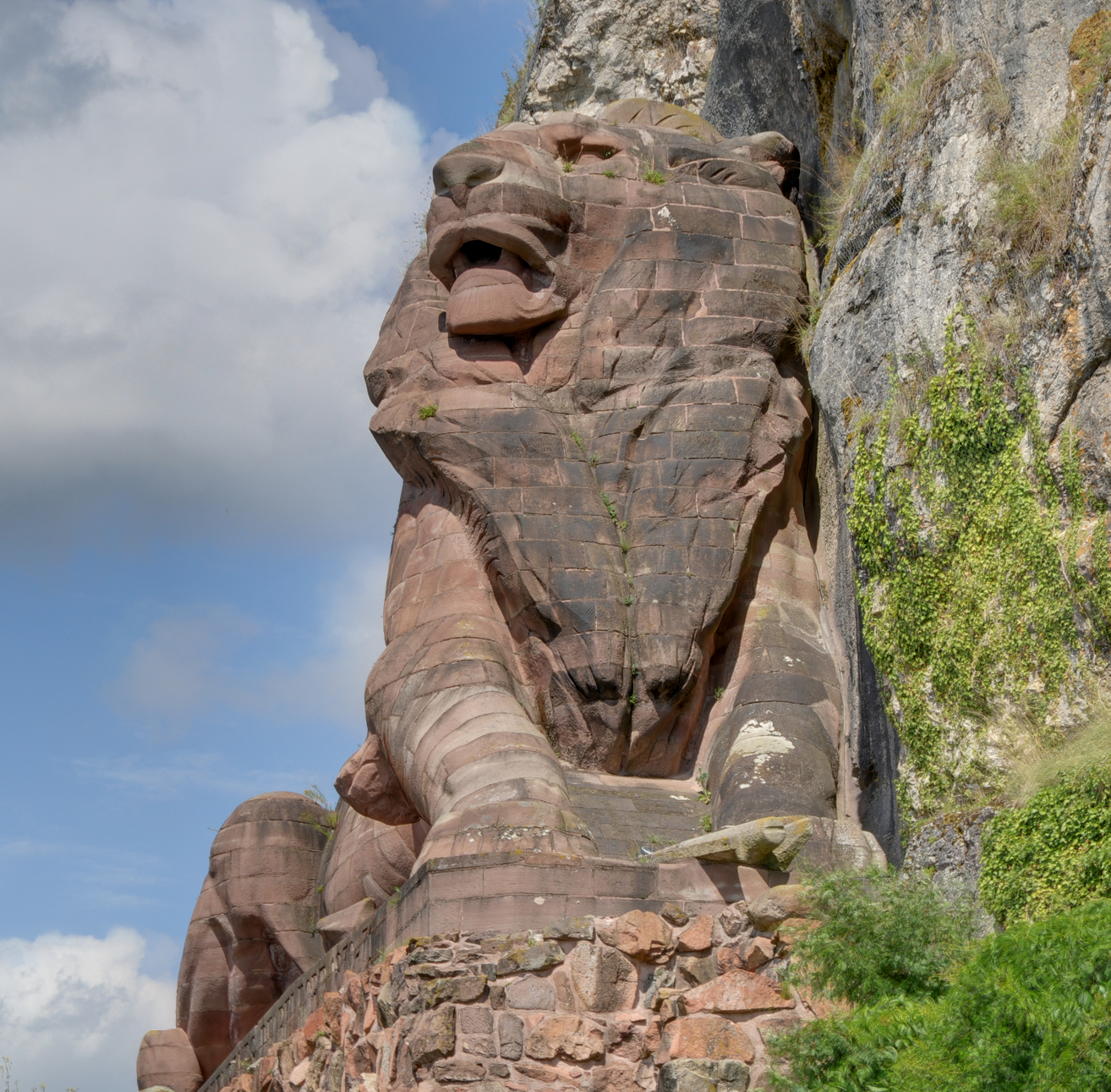
- The face of the red sandstone lion
- Artist: Frédéric Auguste Bartholdi
- Completion date: 1880
- Type: Sculpture
- Medium: Sandstone
- Location: Belfort, France

The Lion of Belfort, in Belfort, France, is an 1880 monumental sculpture by Frédéric Auguste Bartholdi, the sculptor of the Statue of Liberty (Liberty Enlightening the World).

== Overview ==
Finished in 1880, it is made entirely of red sandstone. The blocks it is made from were individually sculpted, then moved to the cliff below Belfort castle to be assembled. Twenty-two meters in length and 11 meters in height, the colossal work dominates the local landscape.

The lion symbolizes the heroic French resistance during the Siege of Belfort, a 103-day Prussian assault from December 1870 to February 1871. The city was successfully defended against 40,000 Prussians by merely 17,000 men (of whom only 3,500 were from the military) led by Colonel Denfert-Rochereau, with the fortress holding out until the Armistice of Versailles obligated French forces to abandon it.

Bartholdi's first preparatory model depicted the lion facing defiantly east towards Prussia, but he was then asked to calm its expression to avoid a diplomatic fallout with the German Empire. In response he reversed the statue to face west with its rear to Prussia, but added an arrow beneath its front paw that points back towards the German border.

Smaller editions of the statue stand in the center of Place Denfert-Rochereau in Paris and also in Dorchester Square in Downtown Montreal.

== Gallery ==
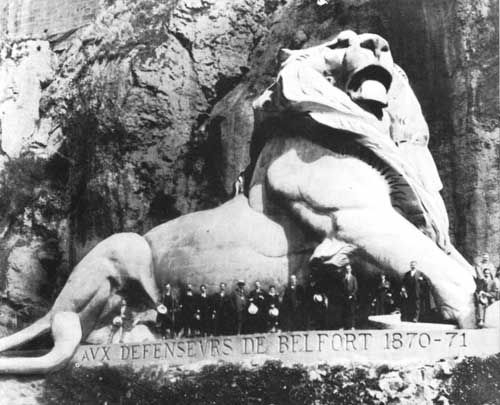
People standing in front of the sculpture, showing its enormous size.

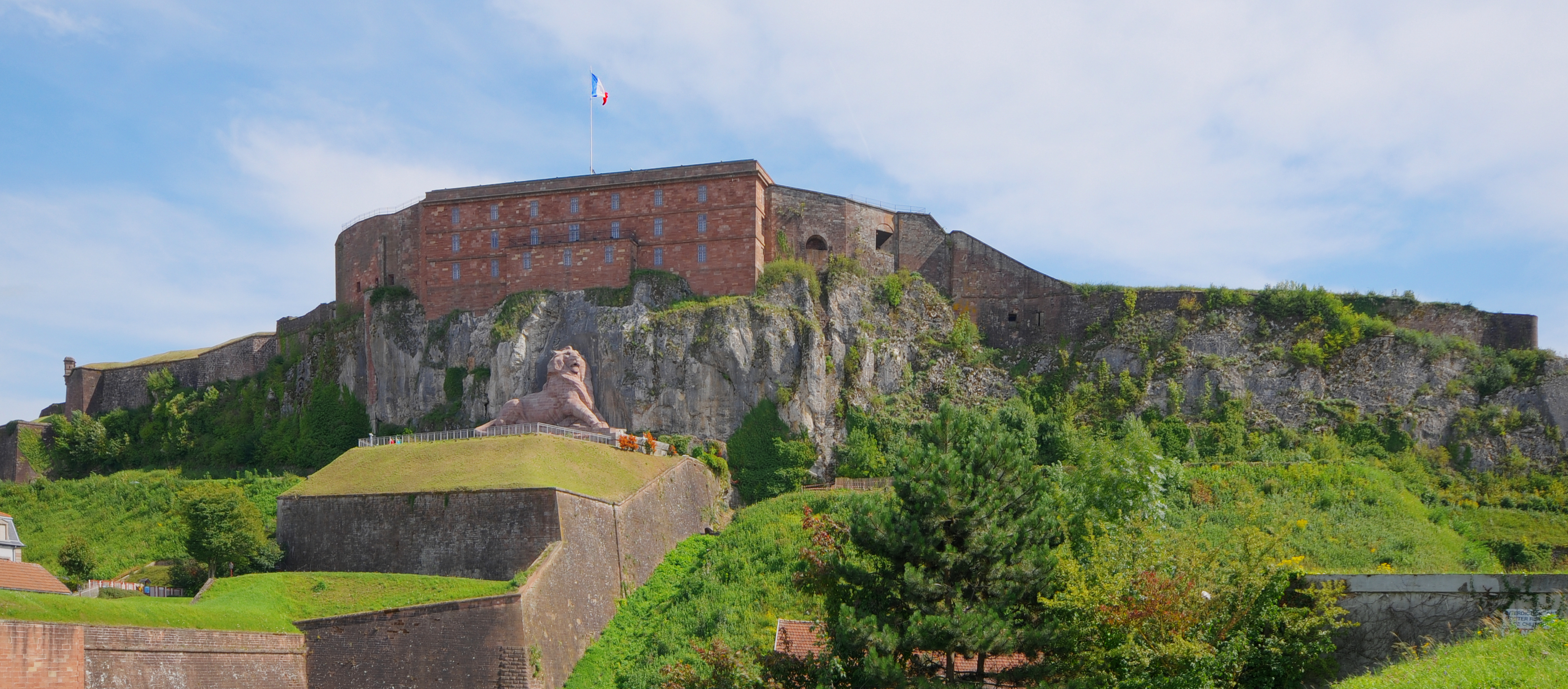
The Lion beneath the Belfort citadel.

The Lion of Belfort

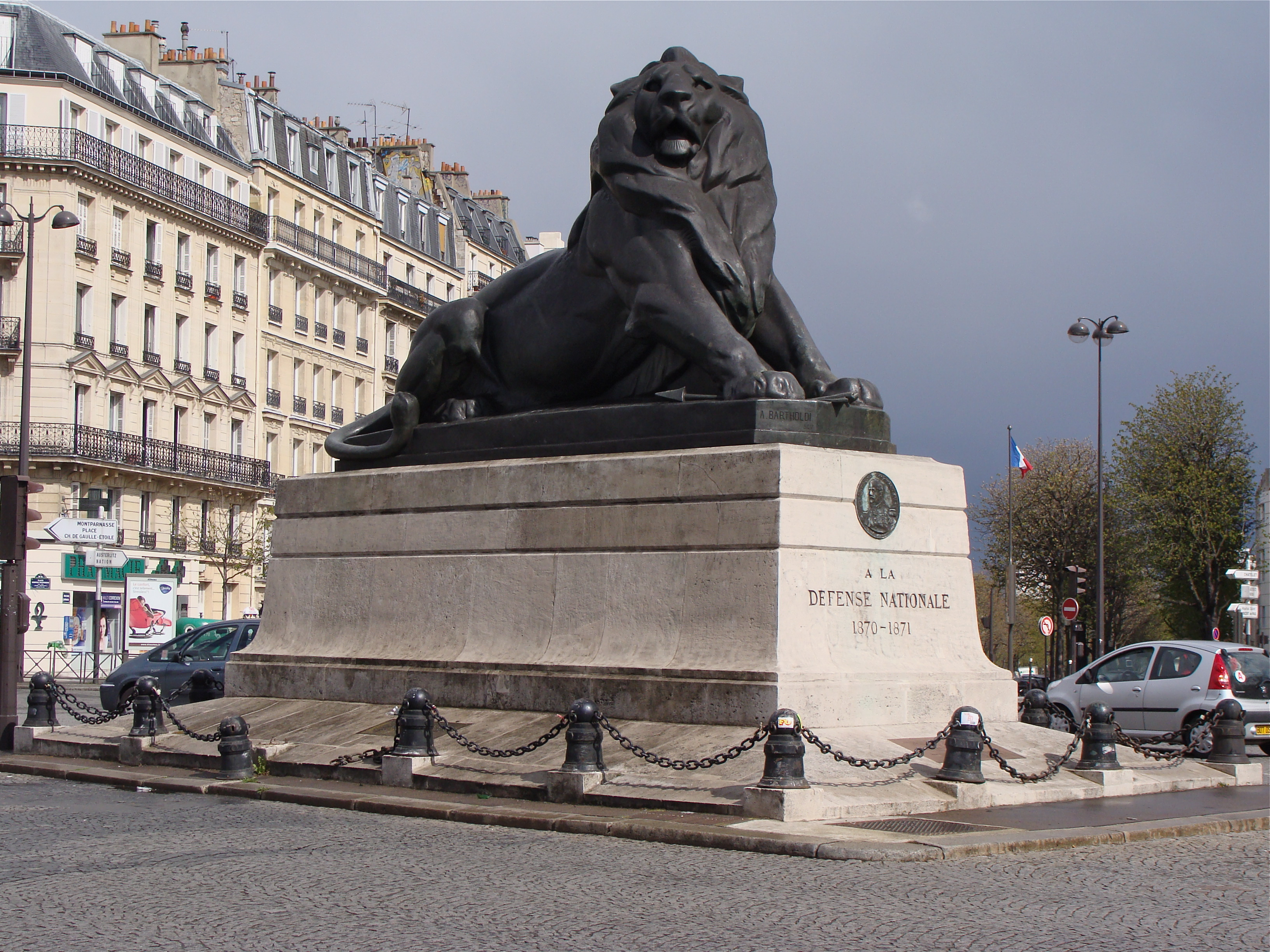
Bronze reduction of the sculpture in Place Denfert-Rochereau, Paris.

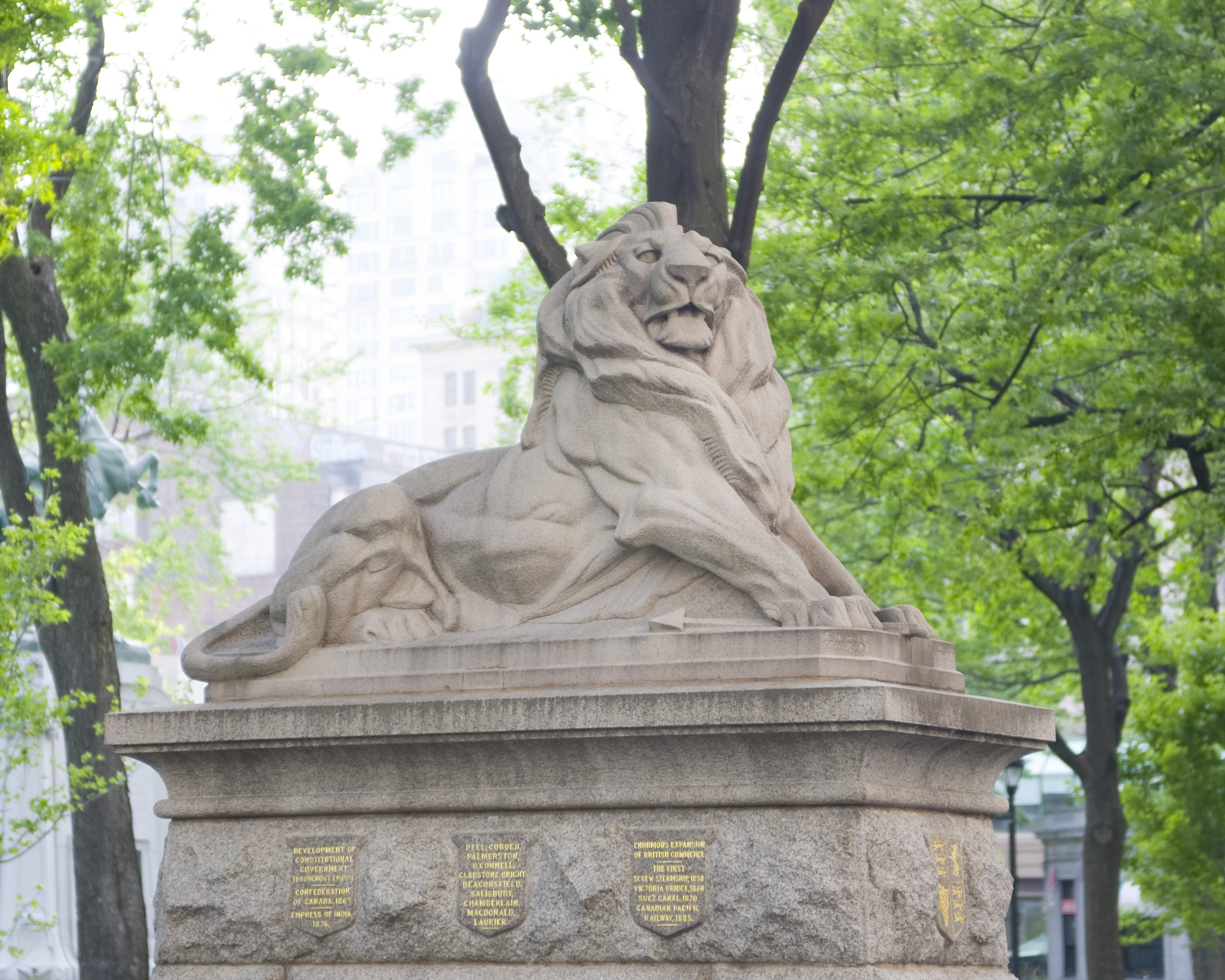
Stone reduction of the sculpture in Dorchester Square in Montréal.

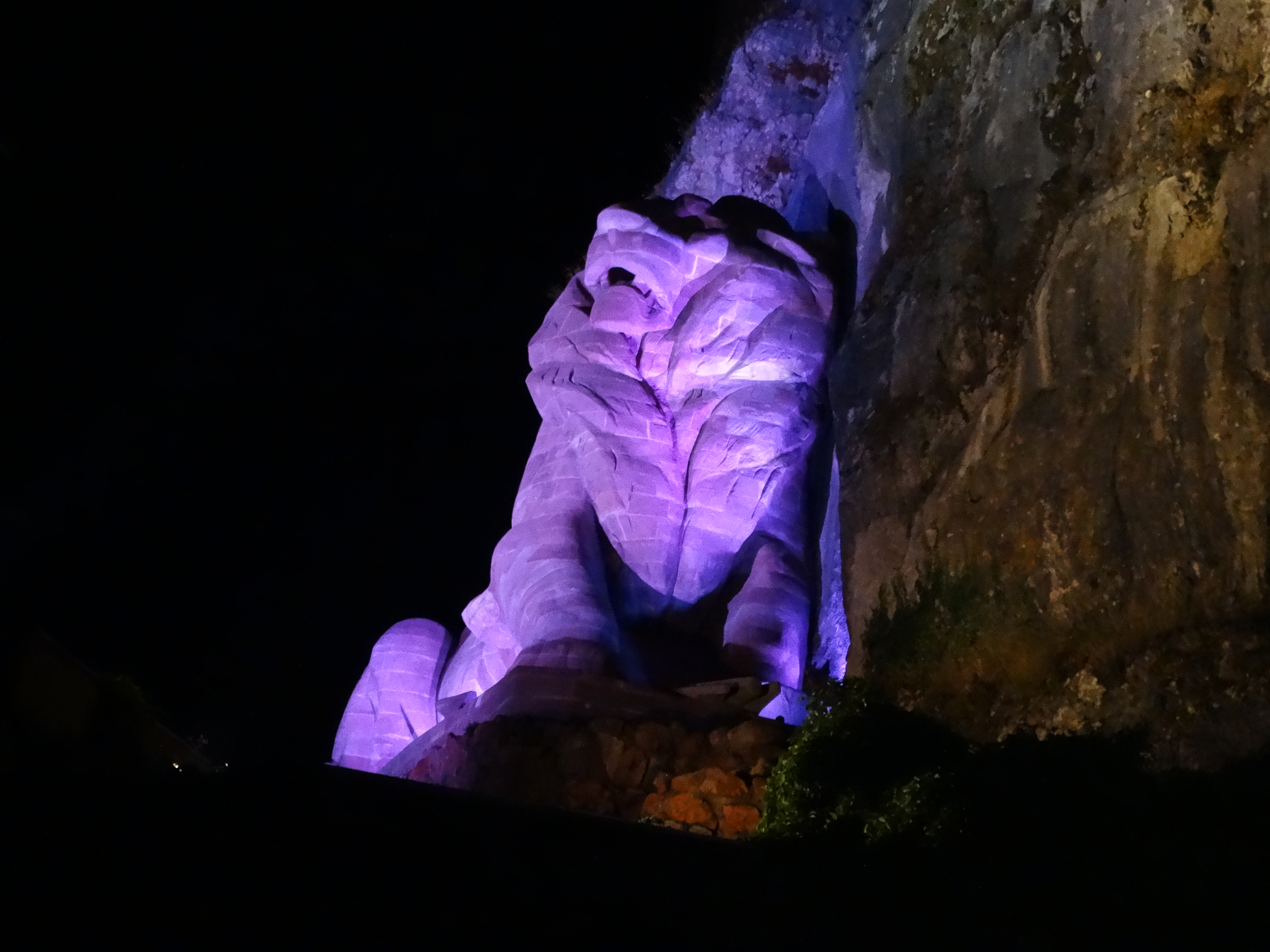
Belfort Lion at night

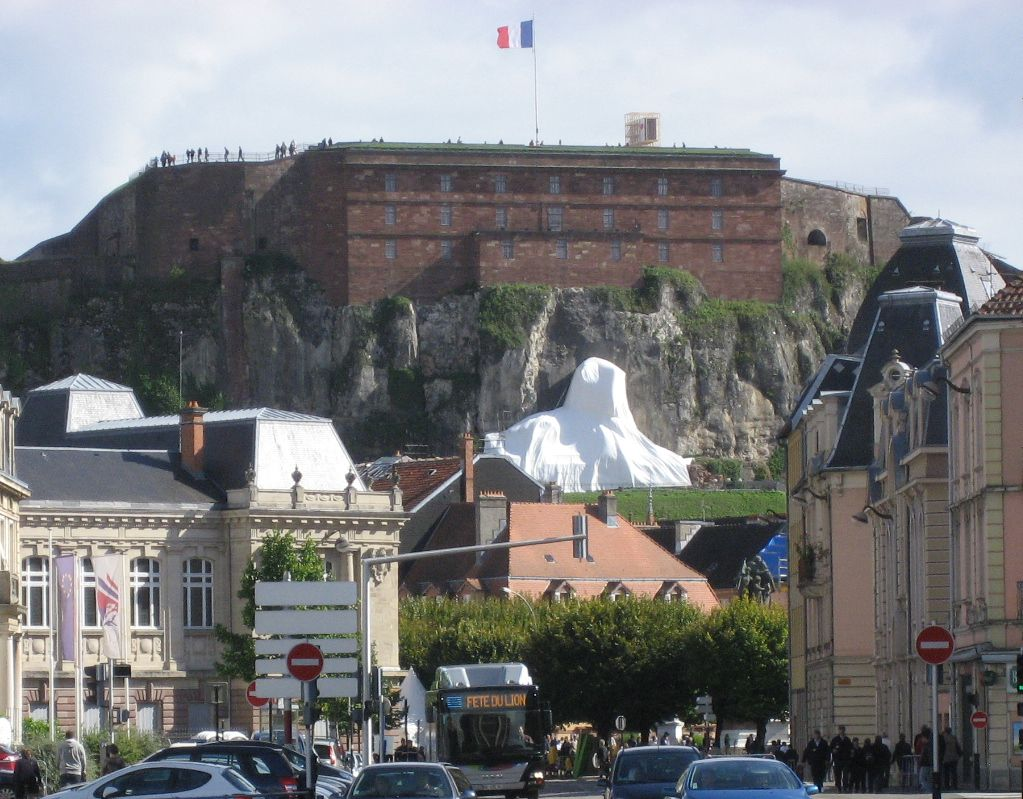
The Lion just before official inauguration on September 18, 2011.

== See also ==
- List of tallest statues
