= Museum of Modern Art (disambiguation) =

The Museum of Modern Art is a museum in New York City, US.

Museum of Modern Art may also refer to:

== Austria ==
- Mumok, Vienna
- Museum der Moderne Salzburg

== Australia ==
- Museum of Modern Art Australia

== Belgium ==
- Museum of Modern Art, Antwerp

== Brazil ==
- Museum of Modern Art of Bahia
- Museum of Modern Art, Rio de Janeiro
- São Paulo Museum of Modern Art

== Colombia ==
- Bogotá Museum of Modern Art
- Medellín Museum of Modern Art
- Barranquilla Museum of Modern Art

== Denmark ==
- Arken Museum of Modern Art, Ishøj
- Louisiana Museum of Modern Art

== Egypt ==
- Museum of Modern Art in Egypt, Port Said

== Equatorial Guinea ==
- Museum of Modern Art Equatorial Guinea, Malabo

== France ==
- Château de Montsoreau-Museum of Contemporary Art
- Musée d'Art Moderne de la Ville de Paris
- Musée d'Art Moderne de Céret
- Musée National d'Art Moderne, Paris
- Strasbourg Museum of Modern and Contemporary Art

== Germany ==
- Museum für Moderne Kunst, Frankfurt am Main

== Guatemala ==
- Museo Nacional de Arte Moderno "Carlos Mérida", Guatemala City

== Ireland ==
- Irish Museum of Modern Art, Dublin

== Japan ==
- Akita Museum of Modern Art
- Hokkaido Museum of Modern Art
- The Museum of Modern Art, Gunma
- The Museum of Modern Art, Ibaraki
- Museum of Modern Art, Kamakura & Hayama
- Museum of Modern Art, Niigata
- Museum of Modern Art, Saitama
- Museum of Modern Art, Toyama
- Museum of Modern Art, Wakayama
- National Museum of Modern Art, Kyoto
- National Museum of Modern Art, Tokyo

== Kuwait ==
- Museum of Modern Art (Kuwait), Kuwait City (Mathaf Al-Fann Al-Hadeeth)

== Mexico ==
- Museo de Arte Moderno, Mexico City

== Poland ==
- Museum of Modern Art, Warsaw

== Qatar ==
- Mathaf: Arab Museum of Modern Art, Doha

== Slovenia ==
- Museum of Modern Art (Ljubljana)

== Sweden ==
- Moderna Museet, Stockholm

== United Kingdom ==
- Modern Art Oxford, England
- MOMA, Wales, Machynlleth

== United States ==
- San Francisco Museum of Modern Art, California
- Museum of Modern Art, New York

== See also ==
- Gallery of Modern Art (disambiguation)
- National Gallery of Modern Art (disambiguation)
- Museums of modern art
