= National Museum of Modern Art =

National Museum of Modern Art may refer to:

- Musée National d'Art Moderne
- National Museum of Modern Art, Kyoto
- National Museum of Modern Art, Tokyo

== See also ==
- National Museum of Art (disambiguation)
- Museum of Modern Art (disambiguation)
