= Modern Gallery =

Modern Gallery may refer to:

- The Modern Gallery, the 1915-1919 name of the Marius de Zayas gallery on the New York 5th Ave
- Modern Gallery, Zagreb
- Modern Gallery of the Saarland Museum
- Tate Modern gallery
- Pinakothek der Moderne

== See also ==
- Gallery of Modern Art
