= Port Said Martyrs Memorial =

Monument in Port Said, Egypt

Memorial
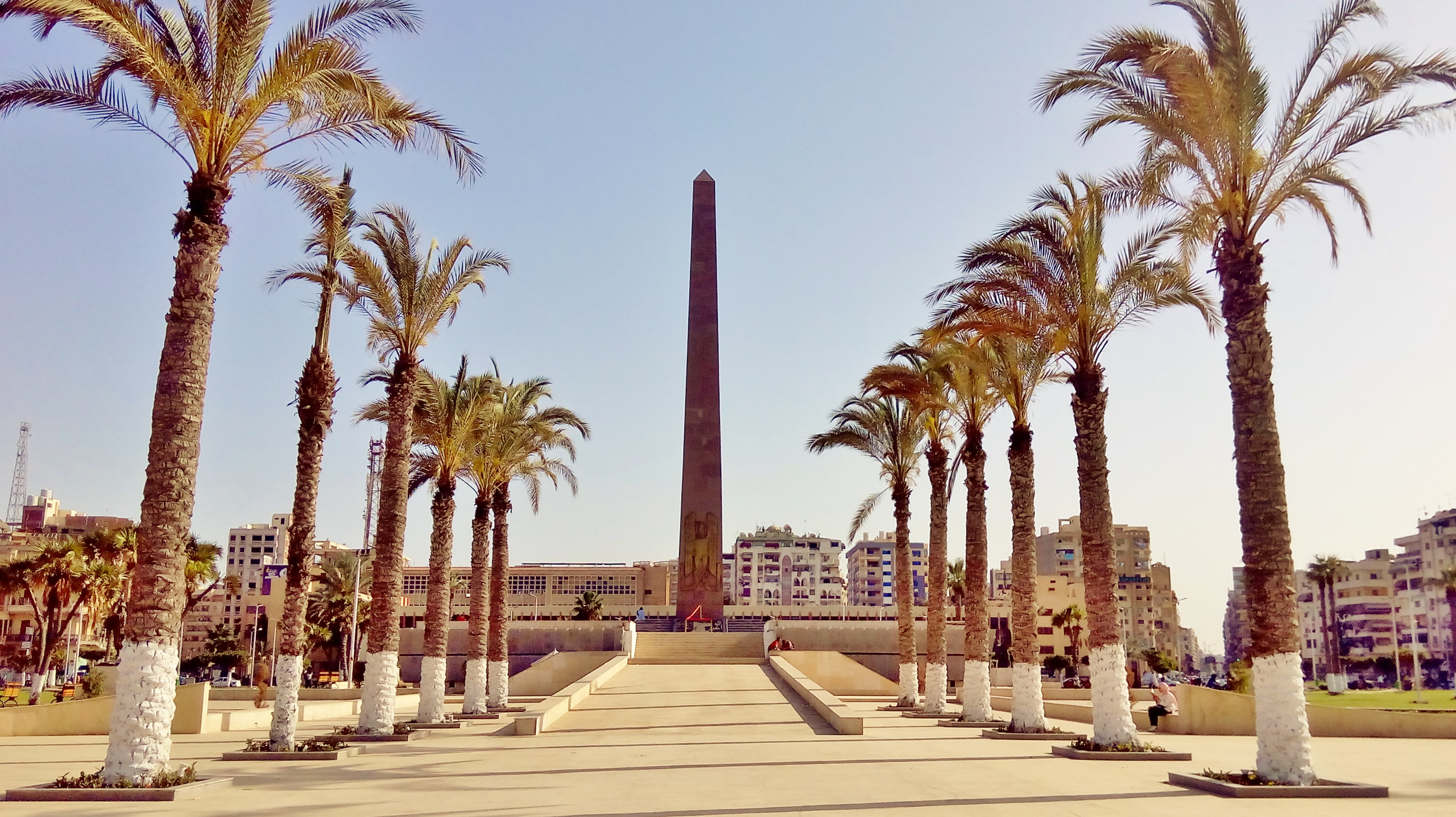
- Memorial obelisk
- Year: 1958
- Location: Port Said

Port Said Martyrs Memorial is a monument in Al-Sharq District, Port Said. It was constructed in the form of Egyptian obelisk covered with grey granite imitating the Egyptian ancestors – the pharaohs – who left obelisks in the sites of their victories over the enemies.

The memorial was constructed to commemorate the martyrs of Port Said during the battles of the tripartite aggression conducted by Britain, France and Israel as part of the Suez Crisis in 1956. The obelisk was erected on a base above a flame. The Museum of Modern Art in Egypt is located under the base of the memorial.

== See also ==
- Unknown Soldier Memorial (Egypt)
