= Sports City in Port Said =

Sports complex in Port Said, Egypt

- Location: Al-Dawahy, Port Said, Egypt

Construction
- Opened: 15 January 2018; 8 years ago

Sports City in Port Said (Egyptian Arabic: المدينة الرياضية ببورسعيد), is a multi-use sports complex in Al-Dawahy district, Port Said, Egypt, which opened in January 2018 with an area of 76,000 m2.

It includes an Olympic swimming pool, a training pool, an Indoor Hall, a hockey court, a hockey and football facility, a squash complex, 5 small football field, 2 tennis courts, 2 multi-purpose halls, A legal football field, a social building and a children's play area.
