= Church of Saint Eugénie in Port Said =

Oldest church in Port Said, Egypt

Coordinates: 31.2604°N 32.3061°E

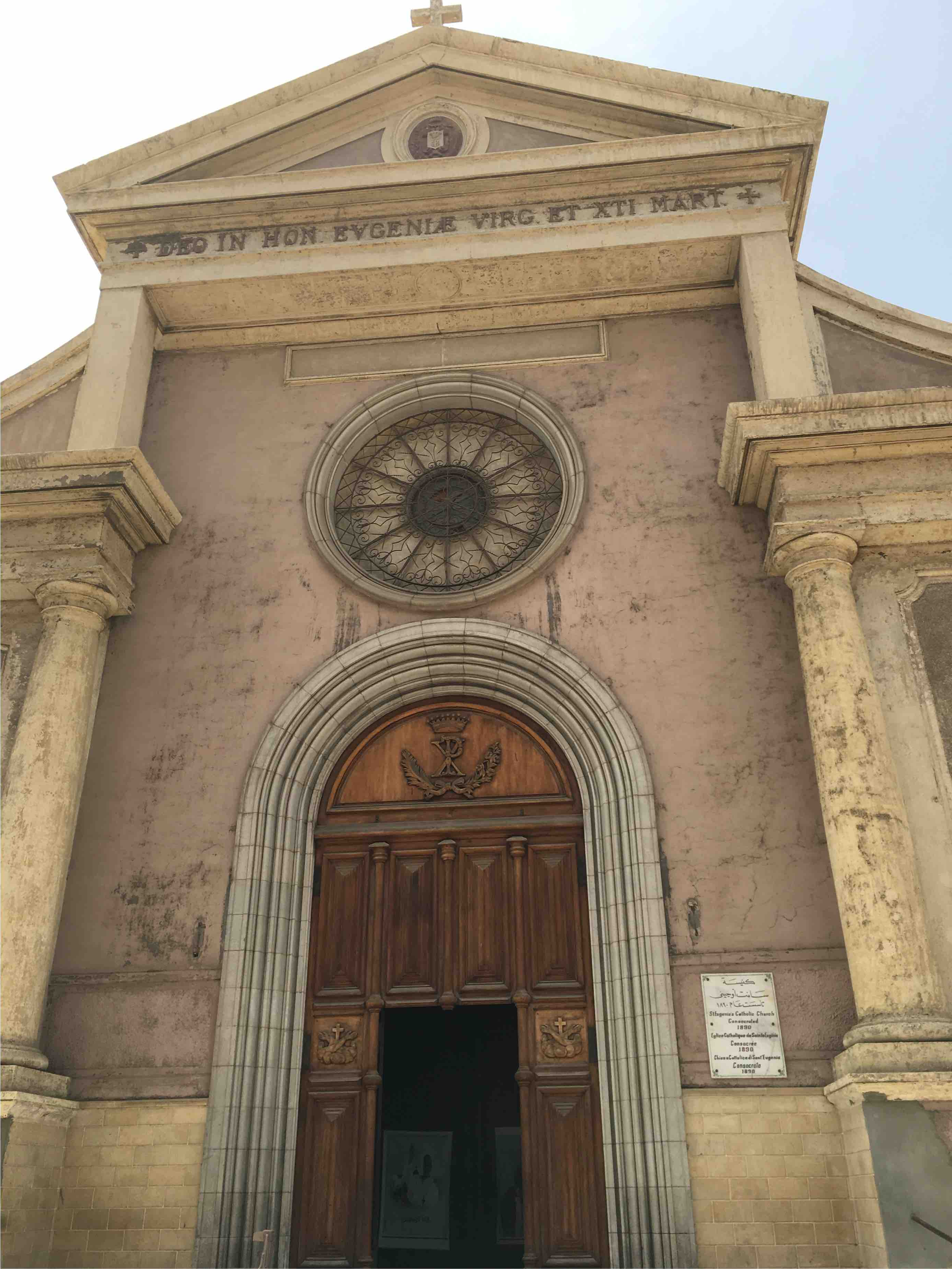
Front of church

Church of Saint Eugénie in Port Said is the oldest church in Port Said, Egypt.

The first, wooden church was built in 1867 on ground donated by Suez Canal Company. Present church was built in 1890, on the same place.

Church was built in European style, joining Classicism and Neo-Renaissance architecture. Floors are made of marble. Walls are decorated with floral and geometric ornaments.

In 2017 church was included To The Heritage List For Islamic And Coptic Monuments.

== Name ==
Some sources name this church as St. Eugene( ), other St. Eugénie. See also this picture
