= National Museum of Art =

The term National Museum of Art or National Art Museum may refer to:

- Latvian National Museum of Art, Riga
- M. K. Čiurlionis National Art Museum, Lithuania
- Museu Nacional d'Art de Catalunya, Barcelona, in Catalonia, Spain
- National Art Gallery, Chennai, Egmore, Southern India
- National Art Museum of Azerbaijan, Baku
- National Art Museum of China, Beijing
  - National Art Museum station in Line 8, Beijing Subway
- National Art Museum of Ukraine, Kyiv
- National Museum of Art, Architecture and Design, Oslo, Norway
- National Museum of Art, Haiti, Port-au-Prince
- National Museum of Art, Osaka, Japan
- National Museum of Art of Romania, Bucharest
- National Museum of Art of Wales, located within the National Museum Cardiff

== See also ==
- Raqqada, the National Museum of Islamic Art in Tunisia
- National Museum of Modern Art (disambiguation)
