= Port Said =

Egyptian city on the northern end of the Suez Canal

Port Said بورسعيد
- City
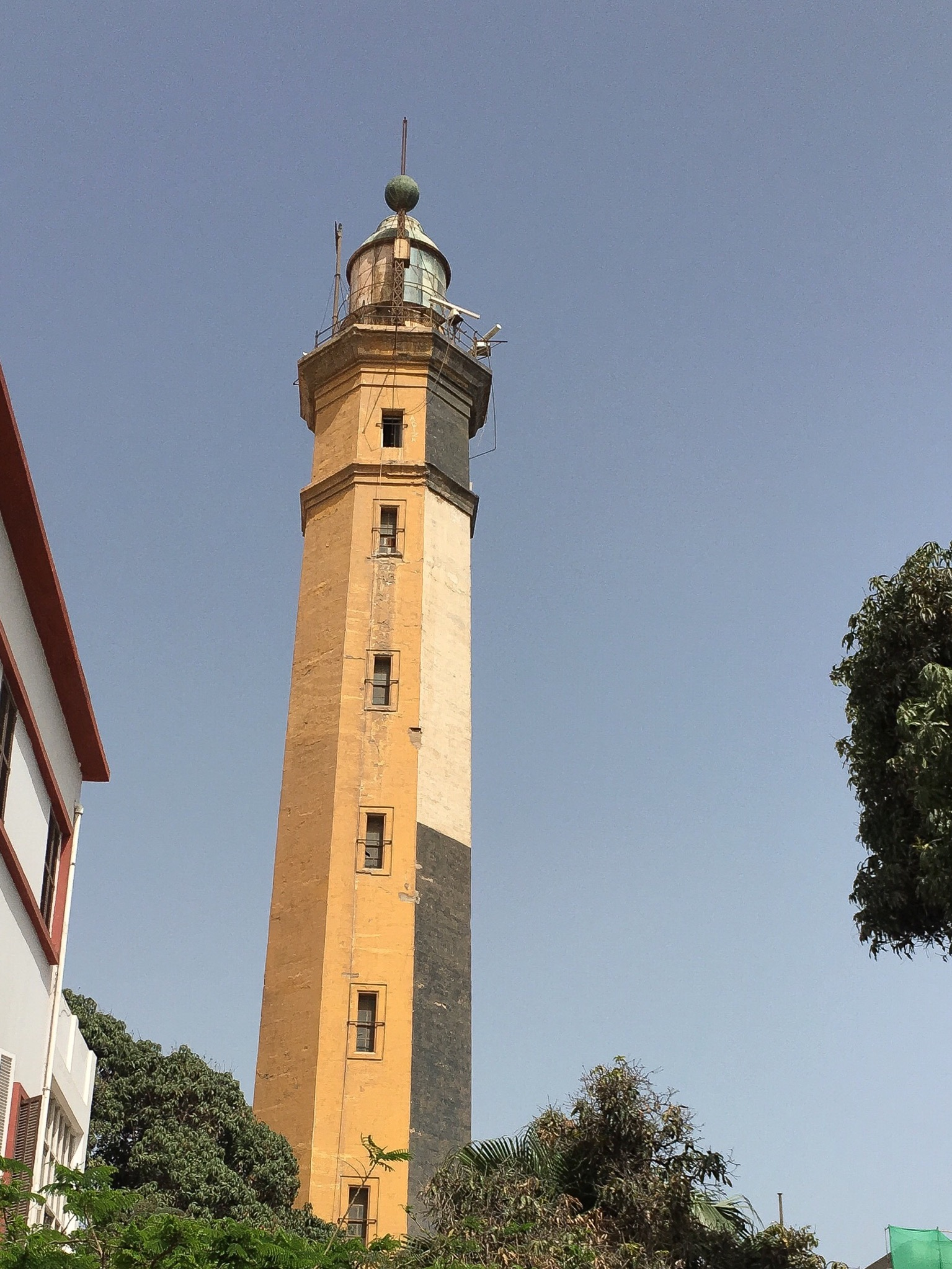
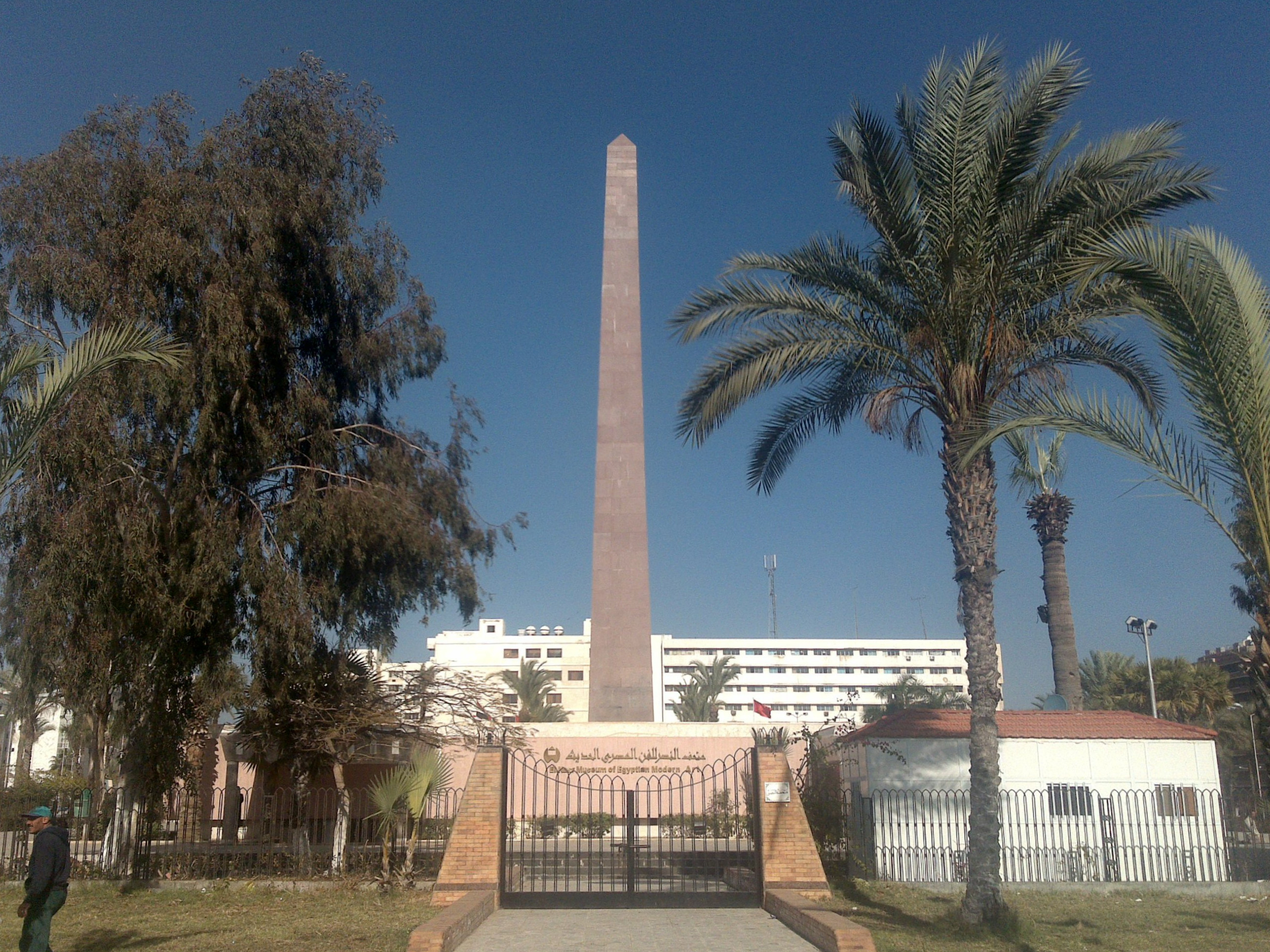
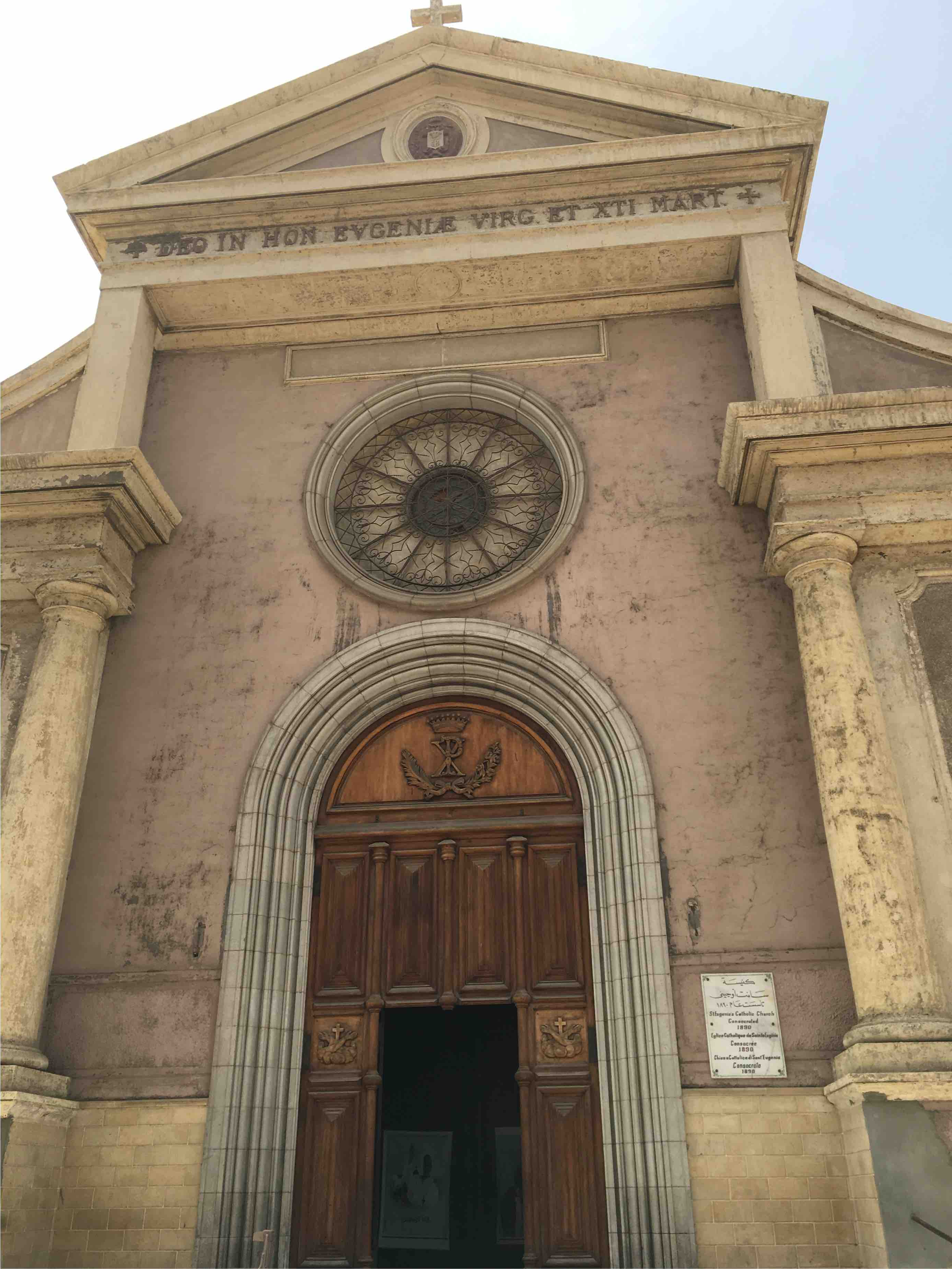
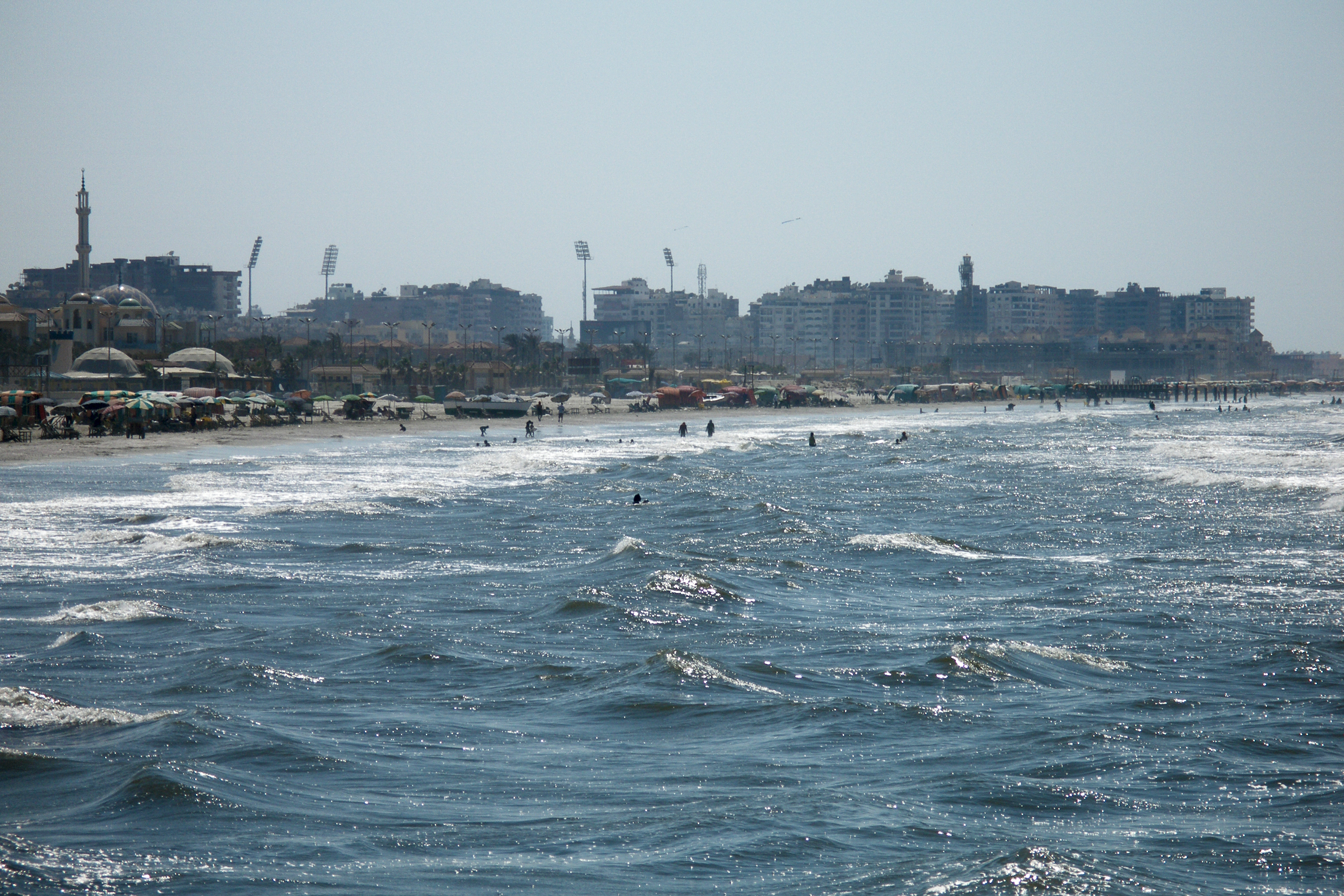
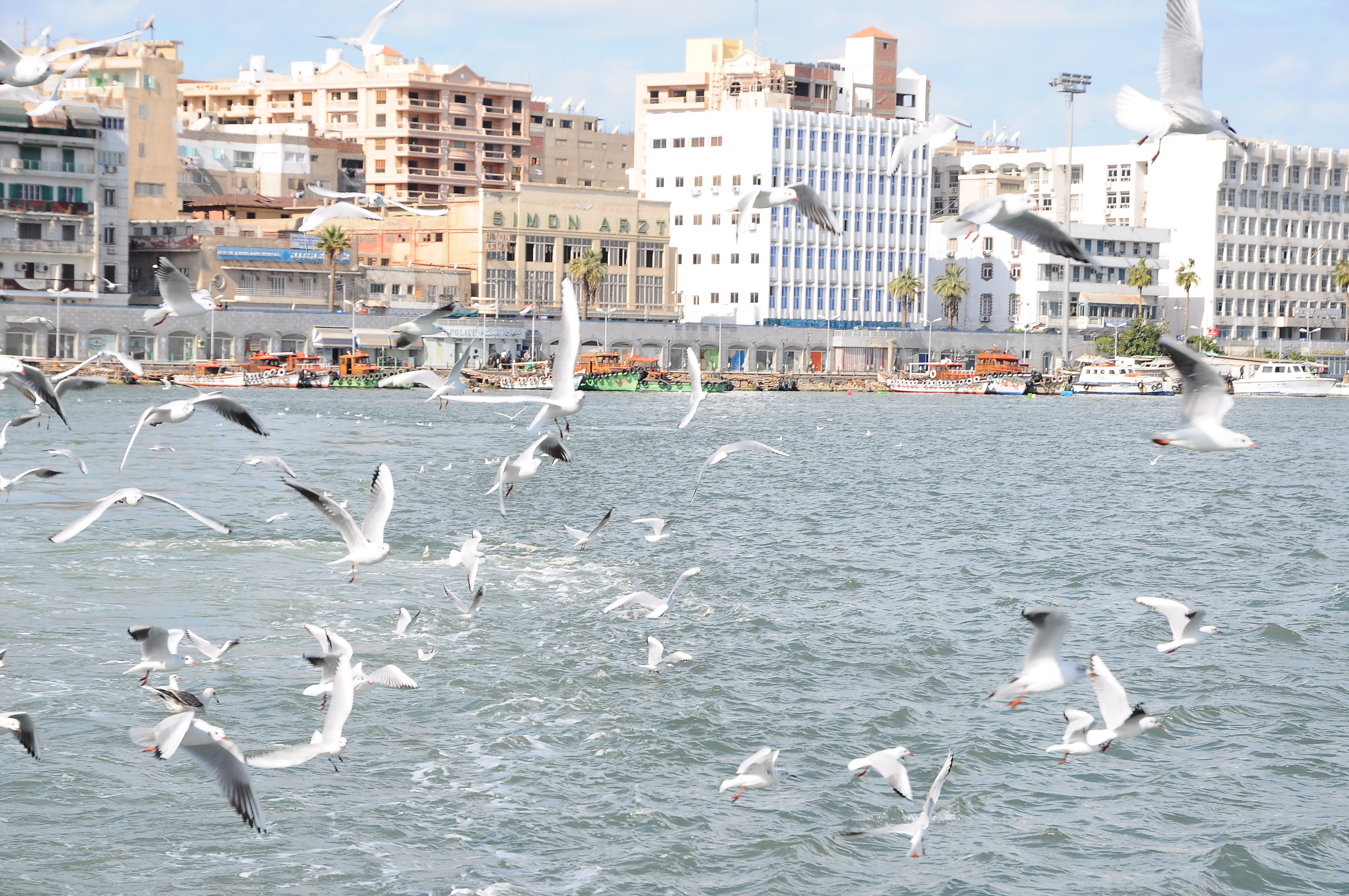
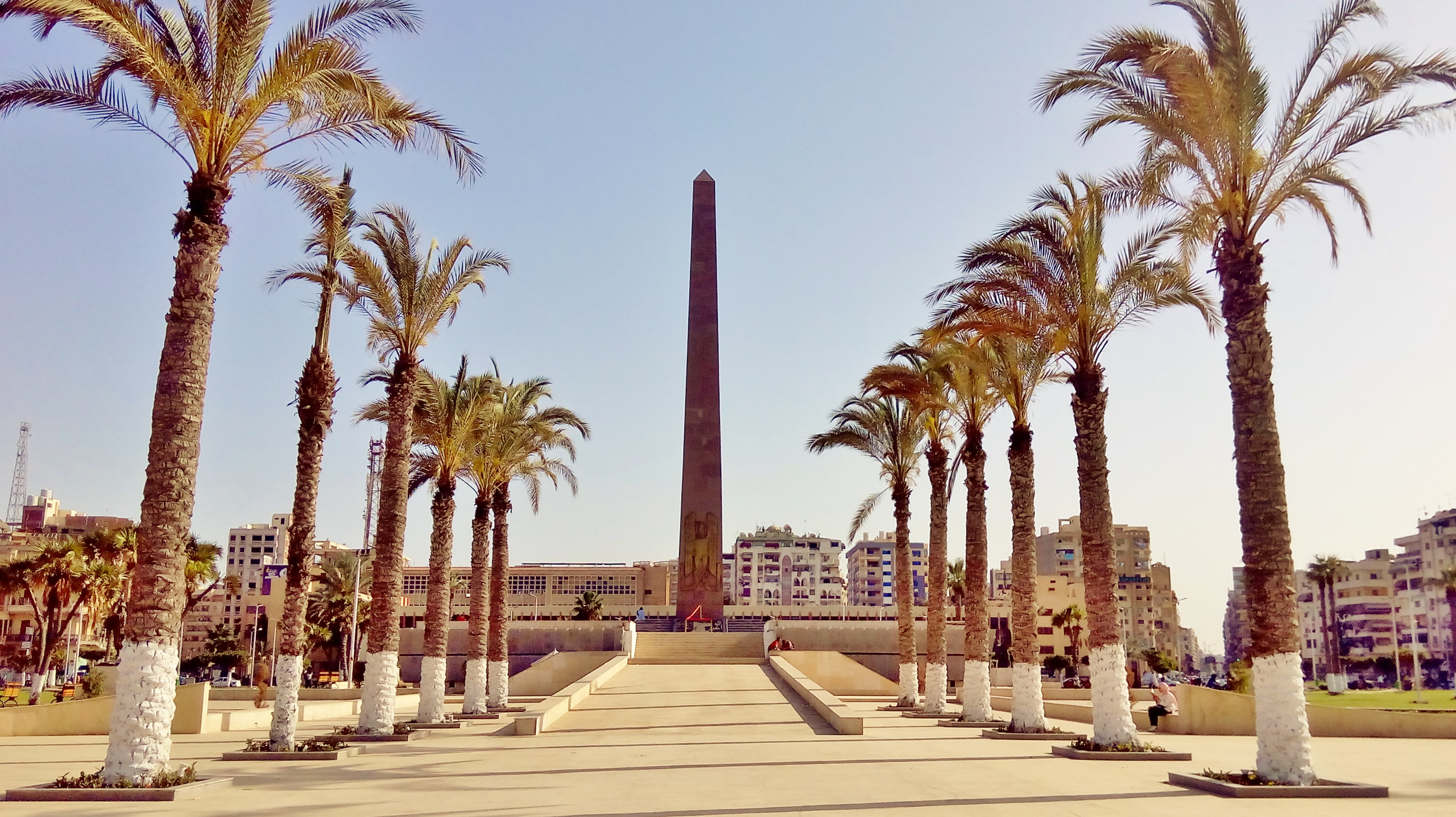
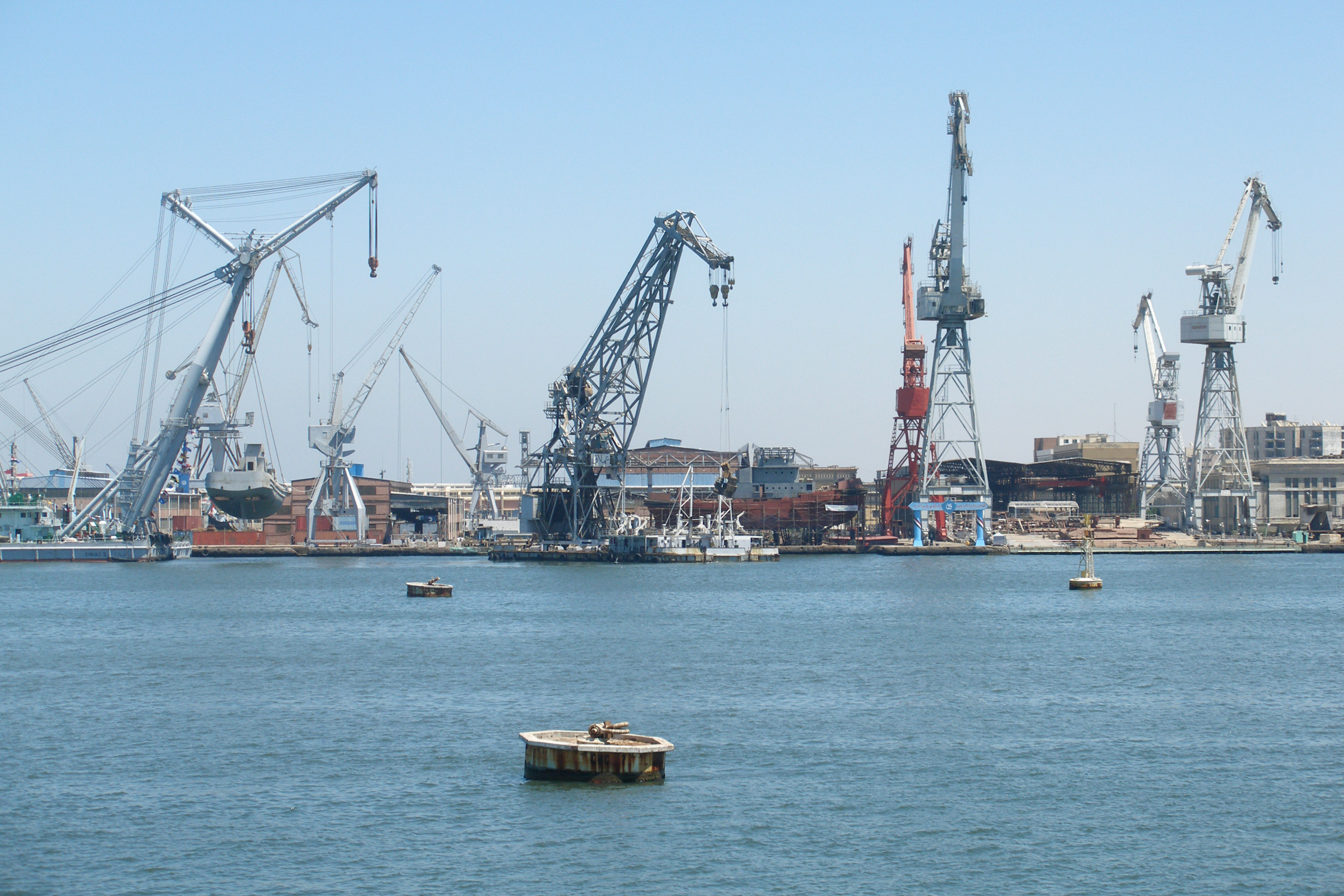
- Transcontinental banks of the Suez Canal Port Said Lighthouse Museum of Modern Art Church of Saint Eugénie The Mediterranean Port Said coast Port Said Martyrs Memorial Port of Port Said

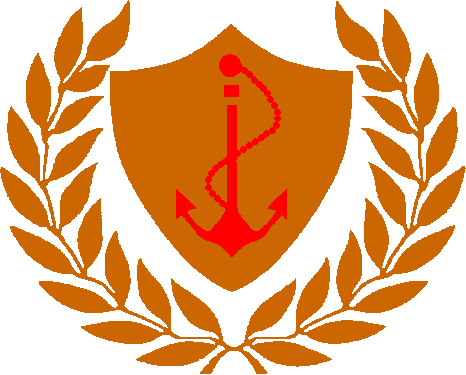
- Flag Seal
- Nickname: The valiant city
- Interactive map of Port Said
- Location in Egypt
- Coordinates: 31°15′45″N 32°18′22″E
- Country: Egypt
- Governorate: Port Said
- Founded: 1859
- Founded by: Sa'id of Egypt

Government
  - Type: City-state
  - Governor: Ibrahim Abou Limon

Area
  - Total: 1,294 km^{2} (500 sq mi)
- Elevation: 6 m (20 ft)

Population (2024)
  - Total: 790,000
  - Density: 610/km^{2} (1,600/sq mi)
- Demonyms: Port Saidian, Bōrsaʿīdi (Male, Arabic: بورسعيدي), Bōrsaʿīdiah (Female, Arabic: بورسعيدية)

GDP (nominal, constant 2015 values)
  - Year: 2024
  - Total: $4.0 billion
  - Per capita: $5,063
- Time zone: UTC+2 (EET)
  - Summer (DST): UTC+3 (EEST)
- Postal code: 425xx
- Area code: +20 (66)
- Website: PortSaid.gov.eg (in Arabic)

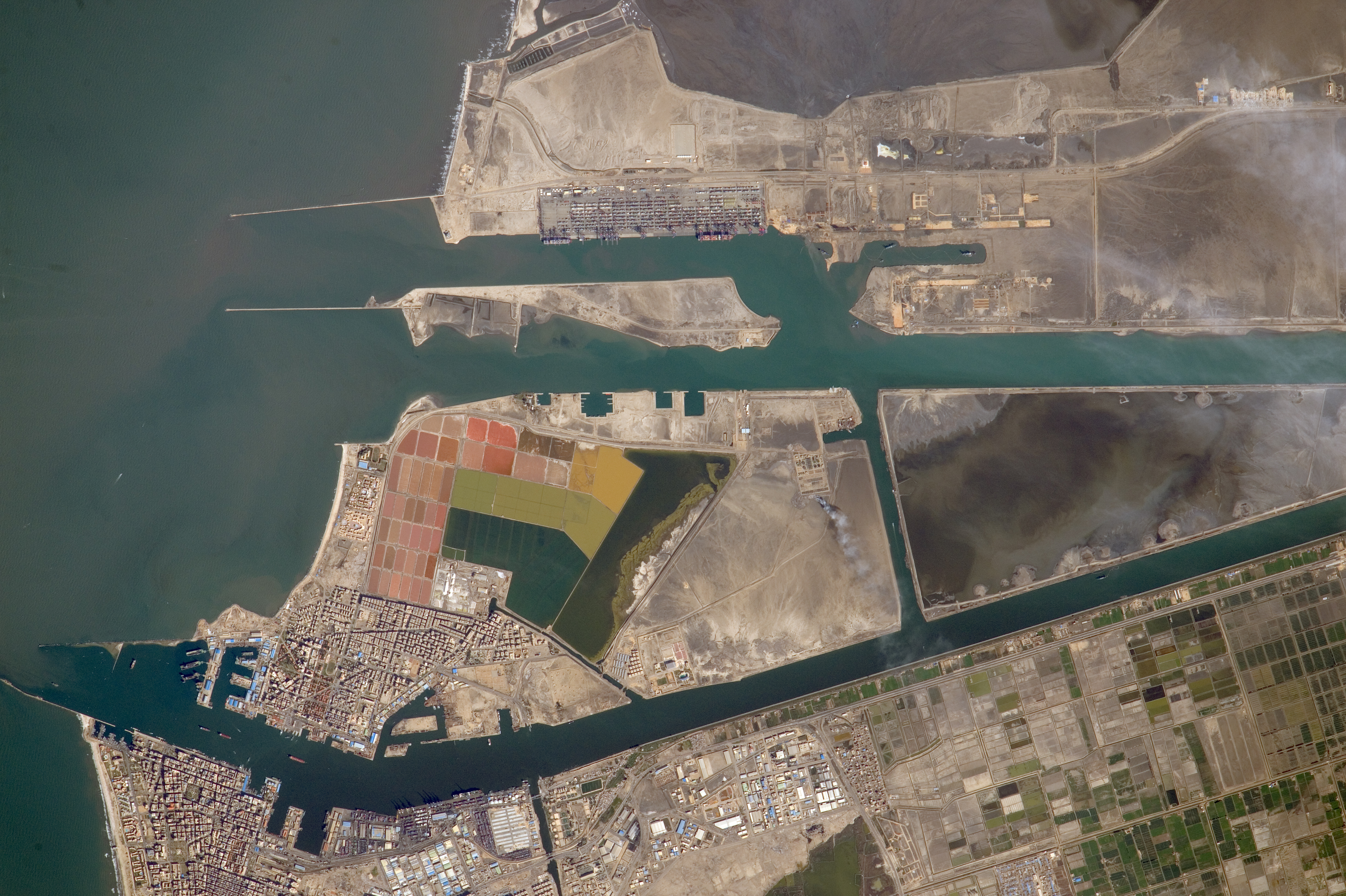
Port Said, Port Fuad and the Suez Canal

Port Said (/sɑːˈiːd/ sah-EED, Egyptian Arabic: بورسعيد, romanized: Bōrsaʿīd, pronounced [boɾsæˈʕiːd, poɾ-]) is a port city that lies in northeast Egypt extending about 30 km (19 mi) along the coast of the Mediterranean Sea, straddling the west bank of the northern mouth of the Suez Canal. The city is the capital of the Port Said Governorate and forms the majority of the governorate, comprising seven of the governorate's eight administrative regions. In 2024, it had a population of 790,000 people.

The city was established in 1859 during the building of the Suez Canal. There are numerous old houses with grand balconies on all floors, giving the city a distinctive look. Port Said's twin city is Port Fuad, which lies on the eastern bank of the Suez Canal. The two cities coexist, to the extent that there is hardly any town centre in Port Fuad. They are connected by free ferries running all through the day, and together they form an intercontinental metropolitan area with over a million residents that extends both on the western and the eastern banks of the Suez Canal, where Africa meets Asia.

Port Said has acted as a global city since its establishment, flourishing particularly during the nineteenth and the first half of the twentieth century. It was inhabited by various nationalities and religions, mostly from Mediterranean countries, and they coexisted in tolerance, forming a cosmopolitan community. Referring to this fact, Rudyard Kipling once said, “If you truly wish to find someone you have known and who travels, there are two points on the globe you have but to sit and wait, sooner or later your man will come there: the docks of London and Port Said”. Port Said is an important city in Egypt for trade and business due to its location on the Suez Canal and Mediterranean coast.

== Name ==
The name of Port Said first appeared in 1855. It was chosen by an international committee composed of the UK, France, the Russian Empire, Austria, Spain and Piedmont. It is a compound name which composed of two parts: the French word port (marine harbour) and Said (the name of the ruler of Egypt at that time), who granted Ferdinand de Lesseps the concession to dig the Suez Canal. Urbanized residents pronounce the name [boɾsæˈʕiːd] or [poɾsæˈʕiːd], while unurbanized residents pronounce it [bɔɾsaˈʕɛˑd].

In Ancient Greek, the city was called Πηλούσιον (Pēloúsion).

== History ==
=== Founding (1859) ===
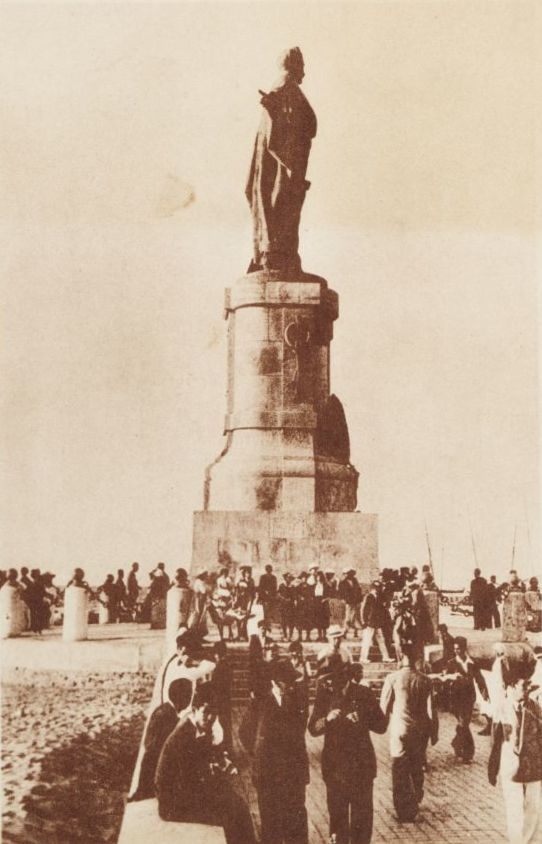
Ferdinand de Lesseps monument on the tourist jetty

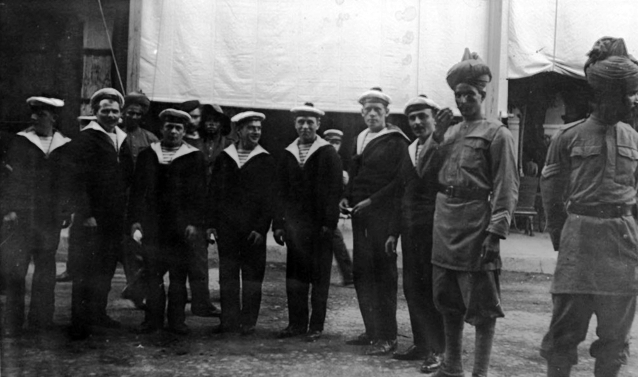
French sailors and Indian troops at Port Said in 1914

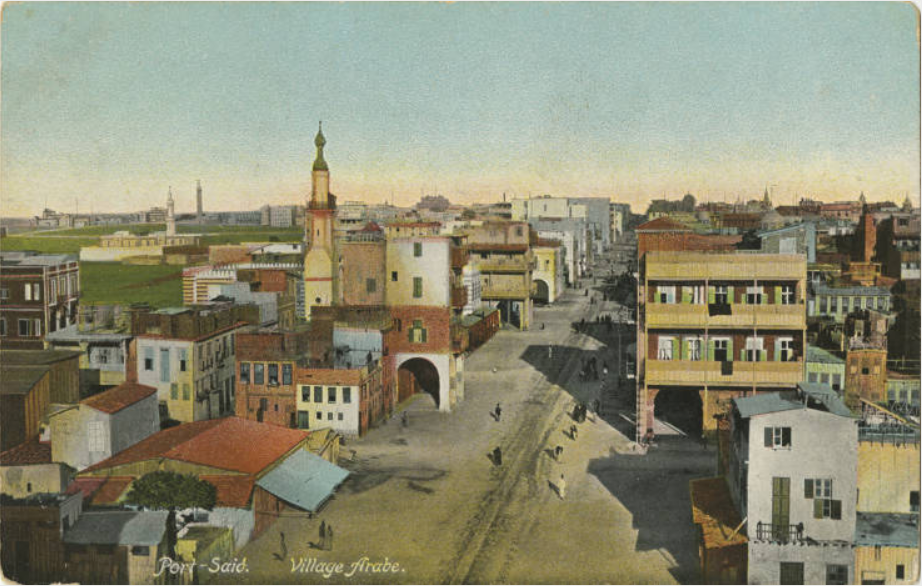
Postcard of the Arab quarter of Port Said

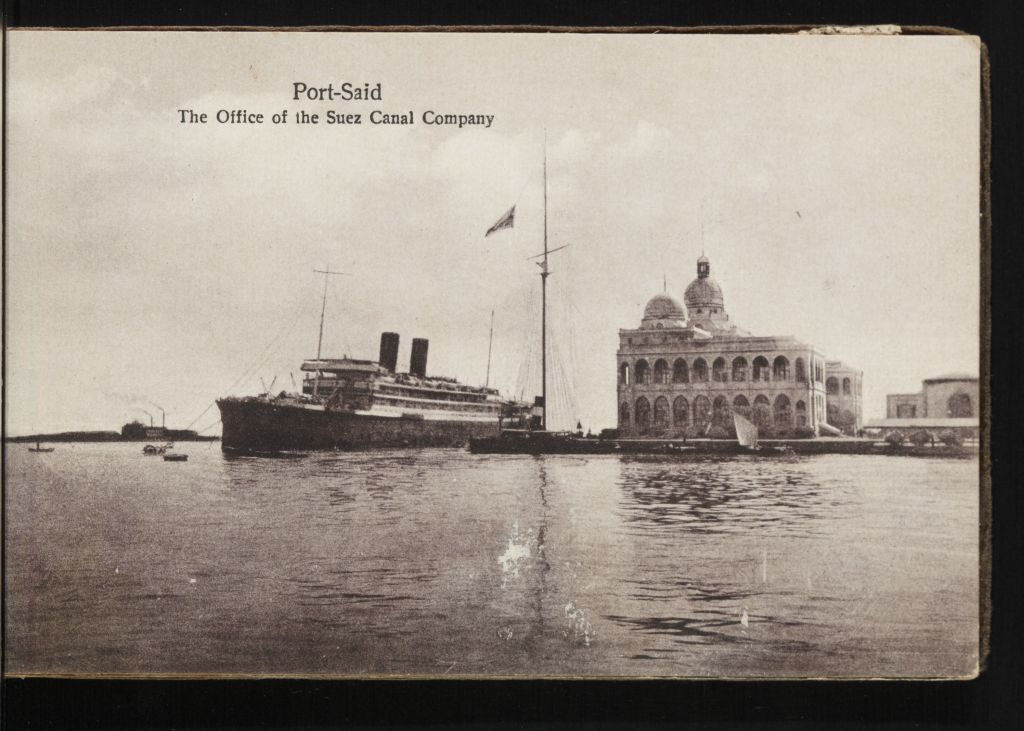
The office of the Suez Canal Company in Port Said, built in 1893

Port Said was founded by Sa'id of Egypt on Easter Monday, 25 April 1859, when Ferdinand de Lesseps gave the first symbolic swing of the pickaxe to signal the beginning of construction. The first problem encountered was the difficulty for ships to drop anchor nearby. Luckily, a single rocky outcrop flush with the shoreline was discovered a few hundred meters away. Equipped with a wooden wharf, it served as a mooring berth for the boats. Soon after, a wooden jetty was built, connecting the departure islet, as it quickly became known, to the beach. This rock could be considered the heart of the developing city, and it was on this highly symbolic site, forty years later, that a monument to de Lesseps was erected.

There were no local resources here. Everything Port Said needed had to be imported: wood, stone, supplies, machinery, equipment, housing, food and even water. Giant water storage containers were erected to supply fresh water until the Sweet Water Canal could be completed. One of the most pressing problems was the lack of stone. Early buildings were often imported in kit form and made great use of wood. A newly developed technique was used to construct the jetties called conglomerate concrete or "Beton Coignet", which was named after its inventor François Coignet. Blocks of concrete were sunk into the sea to be the foundations of the jetties. Still more innovative was the use of the same concrete for the lighthouse of Port Said, the only original building still standing in Port Said. In 1859 the first 150 laborers camped in tents around a wooden shed. A year later, the number of inhabitants had risen to 2000 – with the European contingent housed in wooden bungalows imported from northern Europe. By 1869, when the canal opened, the permanent population had reached 10,000. The European district, clustered around the waterfront, was separated from the Arab district, Gemalia, 400 m (1,300 ft) to the west, by a wide strip of sandy beach where a tongue of Lake Manzala reached towards the sea. This inlet soon dried out and was replaced by buildings; over time there was no division between the European and Arab quarters.

Since its establishment, Port Said played a significant role in Egyptian history. The British entered Egypt through the city in 1882, starting their occupation of Egypt.

=== Thriving international port and city (1902–1945) ===
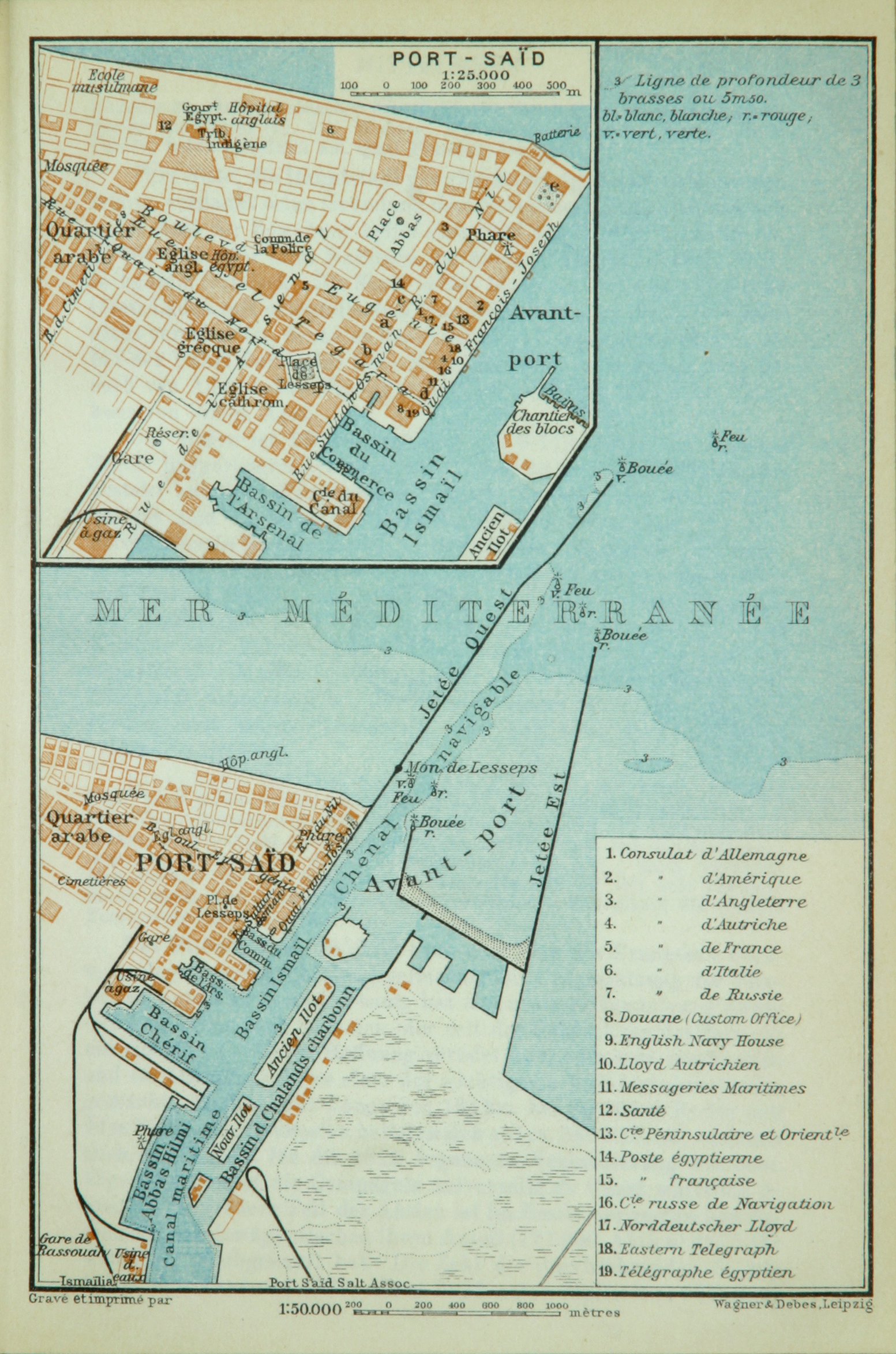
French map of Port Said, c. 1914

At the start of the twentieth century, two things happened to change Port Said: in 1902, Egyptian cotton from Mataria started to be exported via Port Said; and in 1904 a standard gauge railway opened to Cairo. The result was to attract a large commercial community and to raise its social status. In particular a sizable Greek community grew up. In 1907, the quickly growing city had about 50,000 inhabitants, among whom were 11,000 Europeans "of all nations". During the First World War, Port Said became home to an important Allied hospital. Due to the strategic location of Port Said intersecting Europe, Africa and Asia, thousands of men were sent to this hospital. This included soldiers wounded as a result of the Gallipoli campaign in 1915. Following the end of the World War I, the directors of the Suez Canal Company decided to create a new city on the Asian bank, building 300 houses for its labourers and functionaries. Port Fouad was designed by the École des Beaux-Arts in Paris. The houses follow the French model. The new city was founded in December 1926.

In 1936 a treaty was signed between the United Kingdom and the Kingdom of Egypt called the Anglo-Egyptian Treaty of 1936. It stipulated the British pledge to withdraw all their troops from Egypt, except those necessary to protect the Suez Canal and its surroundings.

Admiralty Chart of Port Said, Published 1966

=== Revolution, end of British occupation (1946–present) ===
Following World War II, Egypt denounced the Anglo-Egyptian Treaty of 1936, leading to skirmishes with British troops guarding the Suez Canal in 1951.

The Egyptian Revolution of 1952 led to the toppling of King Farouk. On 26 July 1956, President Gamal Abdel Nasser nationalised the Suez Canal Company. The nationalisation escalated tensions with Britain and France, who colluded with Israel to invade Egypt, the invasion known in Egypt as the tripartite aggression or the Suez Crisis. On 6 November 1956, British troops violently landed in Port Said while firing on the Egyptian military. Port Said next was bombed by the British, to terrorise the civilians, of whom hundreds died. There was also heavy fighting in the streets with again many civilian casualties, and the resulting fires destroyed much of the city.

The withdrawal of the last soldier of foreign troops was on 23 December 1956. Since then, this day was chosen as Port Said's national day. It is widely celebrated annually in Port Said. The French-speaking European community had begun to emigrate to Europe, Australia, South Africa and elsewhere in 1946 and most of the remainder left Egypt in the wake of the Suez Crisis, paralleling the contemporary exodus of French-speaking Europeans from Tunisia. Most of the Greek community was also expelled or left the town under the rule of Gamal Abdel Nasser.

After the 1967 Arab-Israeli war, also called the Six-Day War, the Suez Canal was closed by an Egyptian blockade until 5 June 1975, and the residents of Port Said were evacuated by the Egyptian government to prepare for the Yom Kippur War (1973). The city was re-inhabited after the war and the reopening of the Canal. In 1976, Port Said was declared a duty-free port, attracting people from all over Egypt. Now the population of the city is 794,720.

== Geography ==
Port Said is located in the country of Egypt, on the southern coast of the Mediterranean. It is in the Far East Nile delta area.

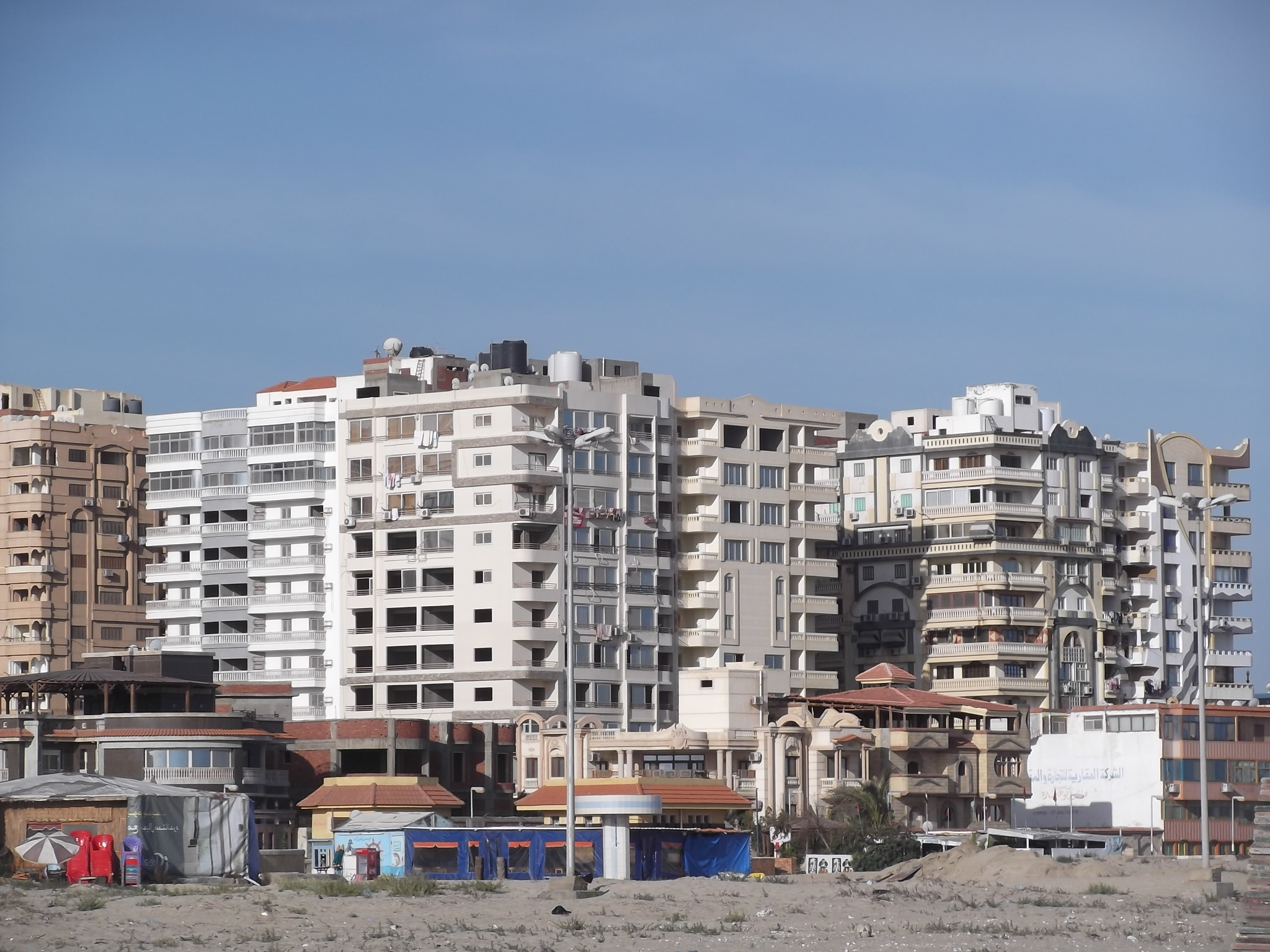
Buildings by the beach

Modern Port Said is divided into seven districts:

- South District
- Flowers District
- El-Dawahi District:
- East District
- El-Manakh District
- El-Arab District
- West District

Port Said's districts are further subdivided in to eight qism (police ward) which had a total estimated population as of January 2023 of 680,375 people:

Anglicized name	Native name	Egyptian transliteration	Population (January 2023 est.)	Type
El Dawahi	الضواحى	El-Ḍawāḥi	148,624	
El Arab	العرب	El-'Arab	60,251	
South	الجنوب	El-Ganūb	41,901	
South 2	الجنوب تانى	El-Ganūb 2	38,273	
El Manakh	المناخ	El-Manākh	84,679	
El Manasra	المناصره	El-Manāṣrah	5,587	
East	شرق	Sharq	34,679	
Flowers	الزهور	El-Zuhūr	266,381	

=== Climate ===
Port Said has a hot desert climate (BWh) according to Köppen climate classification, but blowing winds from the Mediterranean Sea greatly moderates the temperatures. This is typical of the northern coast of Egypt, making its summers moderately hot and humid while its winters mild and moderately wet when sleet and hail are also common, yet less common than in Alexandria because Port Said is drier. January and February are the coolest months while the hottest are July and August.

The record high temperature was 44 °C (111 °F), recorded on 20 June 1988, while the record low temperature was 0 °C (32 °F), recorded on 25 December 1979.

Port Said, Kosseir, Ras El Bar, Baltim, Damietta and Alexandria have the least temperature variation in Egypt. Additionally, Mersa Matruh and Port Said have the coolest summer days of any other cities or resorts, although not significantly cooler than other northern coastal places.

Climate data for Port Said (Port Said Airport) 1991–2020
Month	Jan	Feb	Mar	Apr	May	Jun	Jul	Aug	Sep	Oct	Nov	Dec	Year
Record high °C (°F)	29.7 (85.5)	31.9 (89.4)	34.6 (94.3)	41.8 (107.2)	45.0 (113.0)	39.8 (103.6)	36.4 (97.5)	35.1 (95.2)	35.6 (96.1)	34.8 (94.6)	33.9 (93.0)	25.9 (78.6)	45.0 (113.0)
Mean daily maximum °C (°F)	18.3 (64.9)	18.7 (65.7)	20.6 (69.1)	22.9 (73.2)	25.7 (78.3)	28.8 (83.8)	30.8 (87.4)	31.3 (88.3)	29.9 (85.8)	27.6 (81.7)	24.0 (75.2)	20.1 (68.2)	24.9 (76.8)
Daily mean °C (°F)	14.7 (58.5)	15.1 (59.2)	16.9 (62.4)	19.2 (66.6)	22.3 (72.1)	25.4 (77.7)	27.3 (81.1)	28.0 (82.4)	26.9 (80.4)	24.6 (76.3)	20.8 (69.4)	16.6 (61.9)	21.5 (70.7)
Mean daily minimum °C (°F)	11.6 (52.9)	12.1 (53.8)	14.1 (57.4)	16.4 (61.5)	19.6 (67.3)	22.7 (72.9)	24.6 (76.3)	25.3 (77.5)	24.3 (75.7)	22.1 (71.8)	18.2 (64.8)	13.6 (56.5)	18.7 (65.7)
Record low °C (°F)	4.2 (39.6)	6.2 (43.2)	5.0 (41.0)	9.1 (48.4)	12.0 (53.6)	17.7 (63.9)	20.2 (68.4)	20.2 (68.4)	19.5 (67.1)	14.4 (57.9)	2.2 (36.0)	6.6 (43.9)	2.2 (36.0)
Average precipitation mm (inches)	16.3 (0.64)	12.0 (0.47)	10.6 (0.42)	3.8 (0.15)	1.5 (0.06)	0.1 (0.00)	0.0 (0.0)	0.0 (0.0)	0.0 (0.0)	4.3 (0.17)	4.8 (0.19)	7.8 (0.31)	61.4 (2.42)
Average precipitation days (≥ 1.0 mm)	3.2	2.9	1.6	1.1	0.3	0.0	0.0	0.0	0.0	0.7	1.2	2.0	13.0
Average relative humidity (%)	68	66	65	64	66	67	68	68	68	65	67	69	67
Average dew point °C (°F)	8.9 (48.0)	8.8 (47.8)	10.1 (50.2)	12.7 (54.9)	15.5 (59.9)	18.8 (65.8)	20.7 (69.3)	21.2 (70.2)	19.8 (67.6)	17.5 (63.5)	14.3 (57.7)	10.6 (51.1)	14.9 (58.8)
Mean monthly sunshine hours	213.9	206.2	266.6	294.0	337.9	360.0	378.2	365.8	330.0	310.0	261.0	204.6	3,528.2
Mean daily sunshine hours	6.9	7.3	8.6	9.8	10.9	12.0	12.2	11.8	11.0	10.0	8.7	6.6	9.6
Source 1: NOAA (humidity, dew point, records 1961–1990)
Source 2: Arab Meteorology Book (sun)

== Economy ==
Port Said has been ranked the first among the Egyptian cities according to the Human Development Index in 2023; the economic base of the city is fishing and industries, like chemicals, ultra-processed food, and cigarettes. Port Said is also an important harbour for exports of Egyptian products like cotton and rice, and additionally a fueling station for ships that pass through the Suez Canal. It thrives on being a duty-free port, as well as a tourist resort especially during summer. It is home to the Lighthouse of Port Said (the first building in the world built from reinforced concrete).

Due to its excellent geographic location, Port Said is designed to attract logistics start ups along with import and export businesses.

In 2014, the city witnessed the construction of the New Suez Canal, led by the Egyptian President Abdel Fattah el-Sisi.

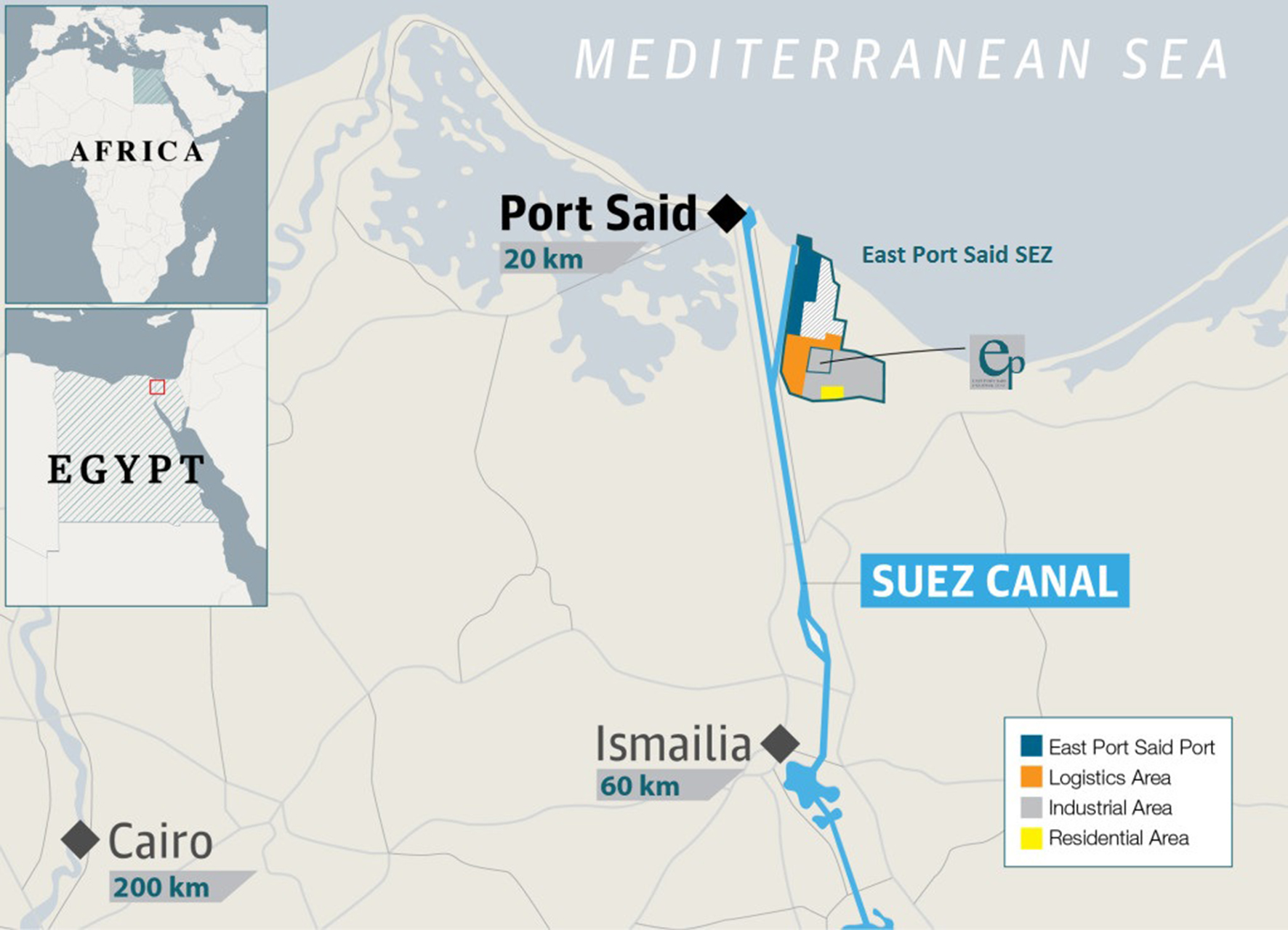
Port Said's location on the Suez Canal

=== East Port Said Industrial Zone ===
The government provides a number of incentives to investors in the scheme including zero tax and duties on tools, machines and raw materials related to the production of goods for export.

=== Tourism ===
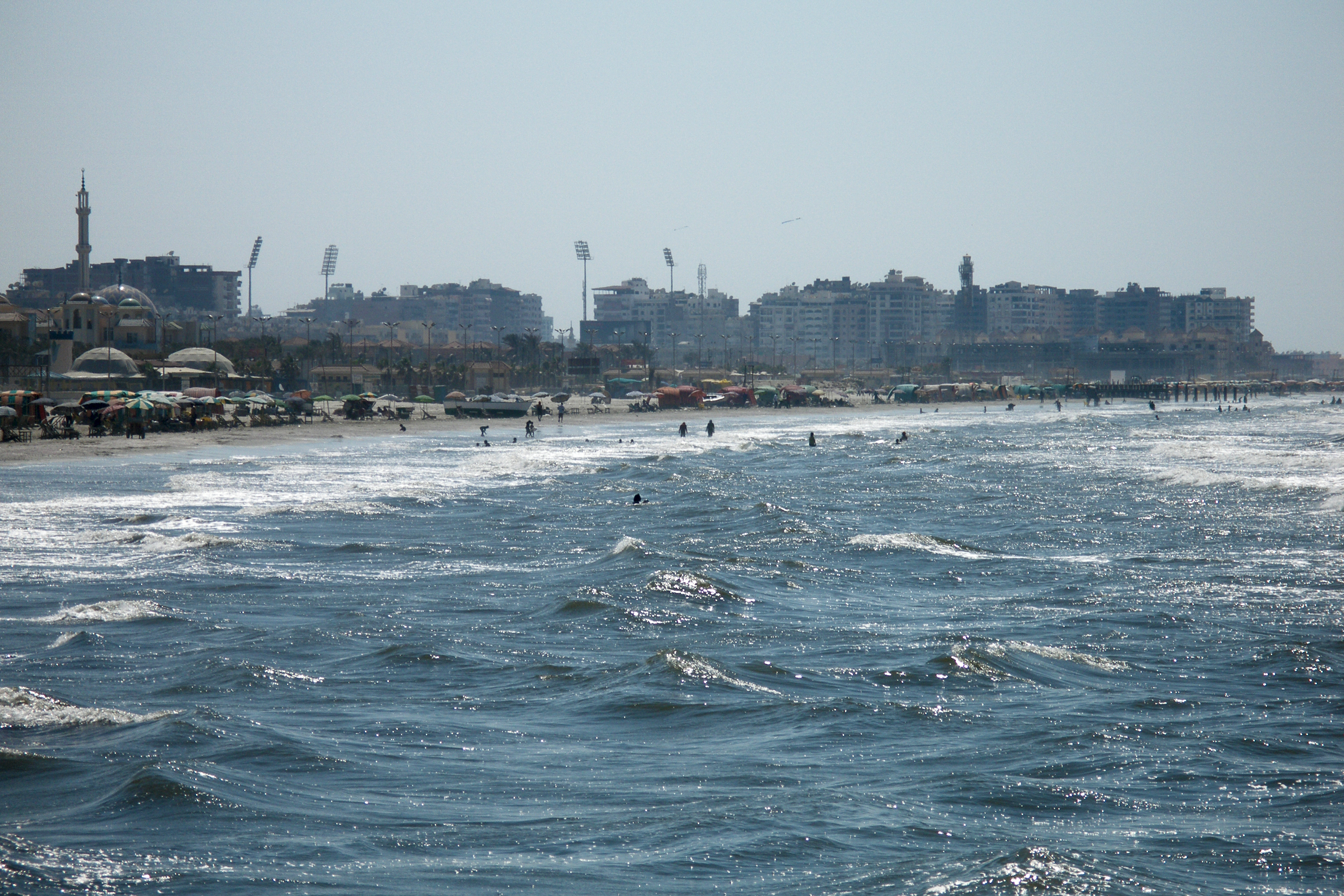
Beach of the Mediterranean Sea in Port Said

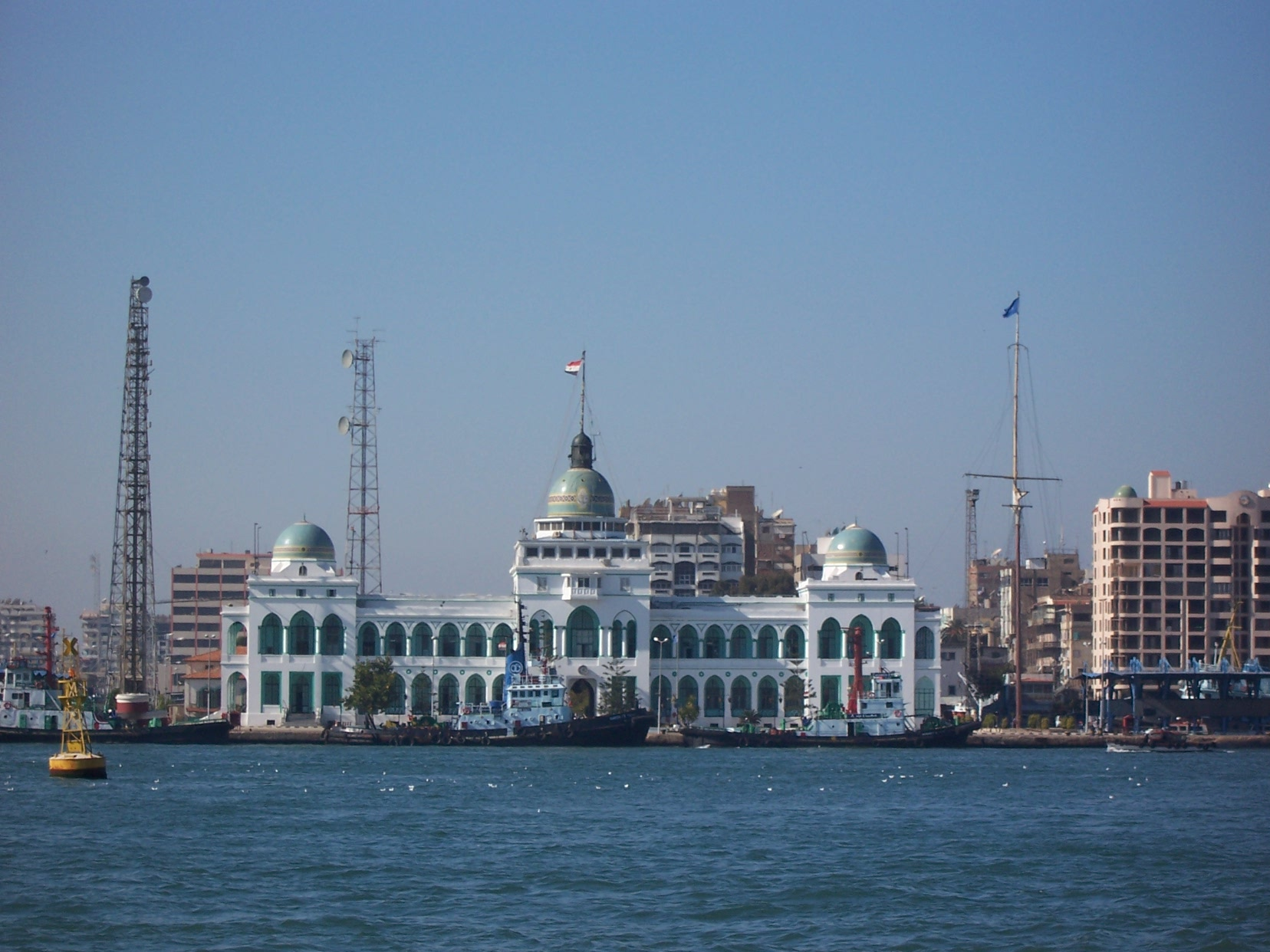
Headquarters of the Suez Canal Authority in Port Said

Port Said is a main summer resort and tourist attraction, due to its public and private beaches, cosmopolitan heritage, museums, and duty-free port, beside the other landmarks like Port Said Lighthouse, Port Said Martyrs Memorial that has the shape of the Pharaonic ancient obelisks, and the building of the Suez Canal Authority headquarters in Port Said. Also, Tennis island situated in lake Manzaleh is a destination that attracts tourists to enjoy visiting this ancient Islamic city which was demolished during the crusades.

Ashtoum el-Gamil is a protectorate which is located 7 km west of Port Said on the Port Said-Damietta coastal road. It is also where Lake Manzalah connects with the Mediterranean Sea. (In front of the mouth of the Lake is Tanees Island. The entire area is a very important place for birds.) Its area is 180 km^{2} and was established in 1988. Its main objective is to conserve the migratory birds. It is managed by the Egyptian Environmental Affairs Agency.

Nearby to the El Gameel area, there will be a real estate mixed use project named Downtown Portsaid. The project will cater to both residents and tourists as well as investors in the area, and is anticipated to be an attraction hotspot.

== Cityscape ==
=== Building of the Suez Canal Authority local Headquarter ===
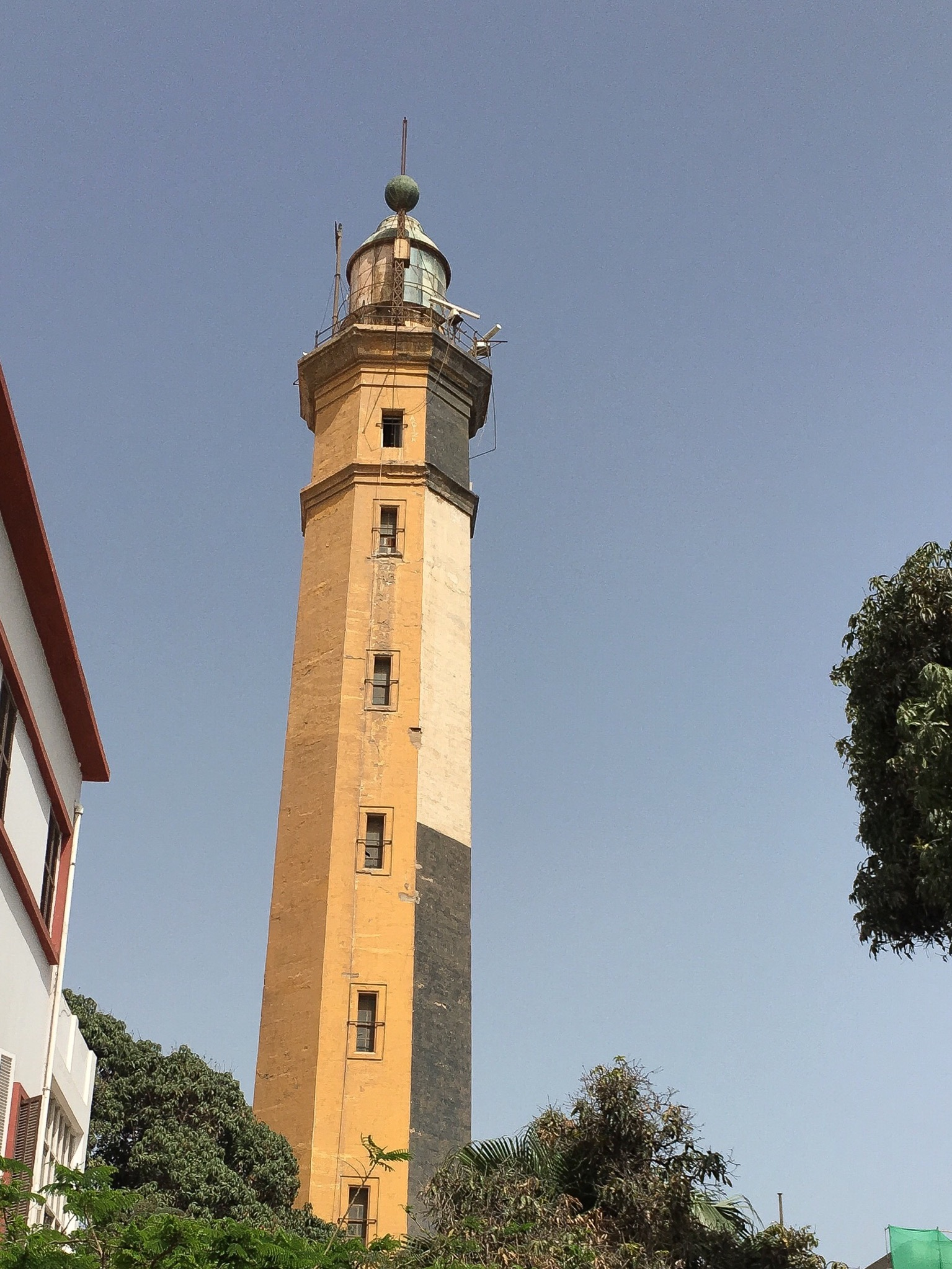
Port Said Lighthouse

Building of the Suez Canal Authority local Headquarter was used by the Suez Canal Authority to monitor the movement of ships passing through the canal. It is located directly on the Suez Canal, designed as a palace in the Islamic style. It was Built by Khedive Abbas Hilmi II in 1895.

=== Port Said Lighthouse ===
Cross of Sacrifice in Port Said War Memorial Cemetery

Port Said Lighthouse, is one of the best-known original buildings still standing in Port Said today. It was built in 1869, one week prior to the inauguration of the Suez Canal. The lighthouse was built to guide ships passing through the canal. It has an octagonal shaped tower that is 56 metres (184 ft) high.

=== Port Said War Memorial Cemetery ===
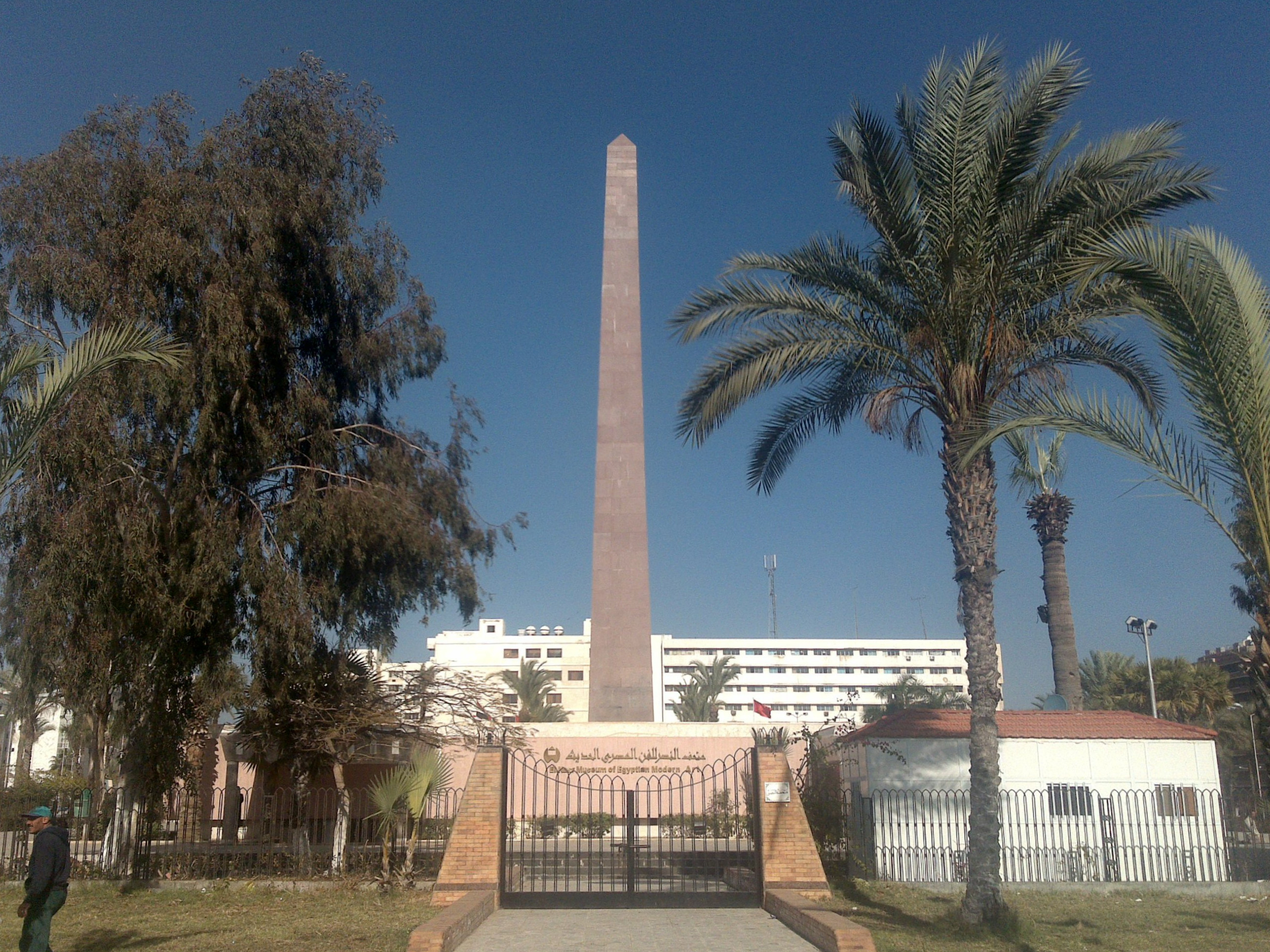
Rear view of the Port Said Martyrs Memorial

Port Said War Memorial Cemetery, was established in October 1914. The site contains 544 Commonwealth burials from WWI and 111 from WWII. It uniquely functions as a multicultural resting place, also holding 430 war graves of other nationalities (including a large French plot, plus German, American, and Serbian casualties) and 7 non-war burials.

=== Port Said Martyrs Memorial ===
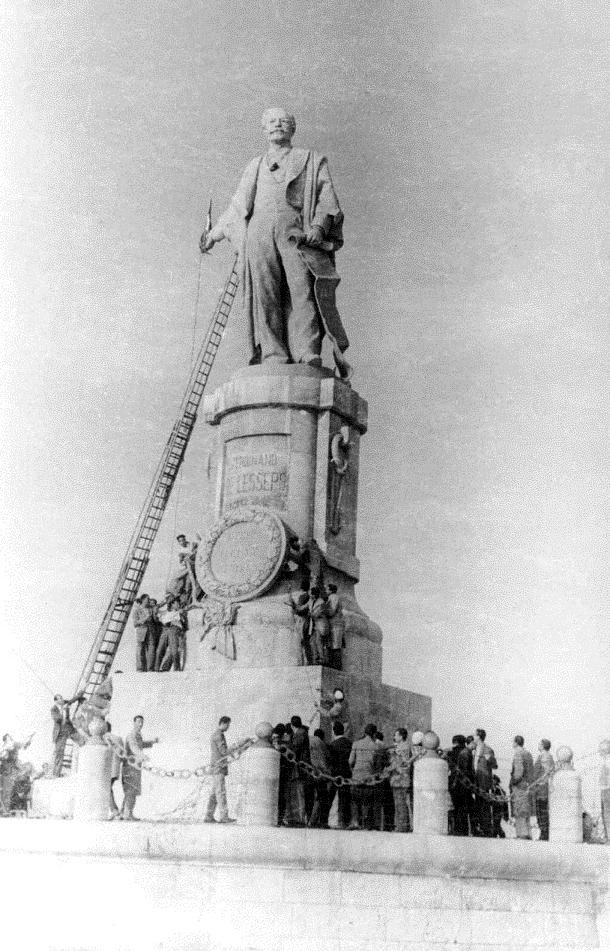
Removal of Lesseps' statue during the Suez Crisis in 1956

Port Said Martyrs Memorial, is a prominent historical monument located in the Al-Sharq district in front of the headquarter of Port Said Governorate. The memorial was Built in 1958 in the form of Egyptian obelisk covered with grey granite imitating the Egyptian ancestors to commemorate the martyrs of Port Said during the battles of the tripartite aggression conducted by Britain, France and Israel in 1956.

=== Pedestal of Ferdinand de Lesseps Statue ===
Pedestal of Ferdinand de Lesseps Statue is located on the entrance of the old tourist jetty along the west bank of the Suez Canal. The statue of Ferdinand de Lesseps and its pedestal were established in 1899 commemorating the 30th anniversary of opening the canal for navigation. The pedestal remains empty since 1956 after the removal of the statue by the outraged people of Port Said in protest against the Anglo-French aggression on the city.

== Education ==
=== Colleges and universities ===
Port Said has a number of higher education institutions. Port Said University is a public university that follows the Egyptian system of higher education. The most notable faculties of the university are the faculty of engineering and the faculty of science. In addition, the East Port Said National University and Al Salam Technological University are both established in 2021 in Salam Masr City East Port Said, as a research universities. The Arab Academy for Science, Technology & Maritime Transport is a semi-private educational institution that offers courses for high school, undergraduate level, and postgraduate students. It is considered the most reputable university in Egypt after the AUC American University in Cairo because of its worldwide recognition from board of engineers at UK & ABET in US. Sadat Academy for Management Sciences is an Egyptian Public Academy under the authorization of the Ministry of State for Administrative Development (SAMS) founded in Egypt in 1981. Other institutions of higher education in Port Said include Port Said Higher Institute of Social Service.

=== Schools ===
Port Said has a long history of foreign educational institutions. The city contains today about 558 schools in all different educational stages between governmental, experimental, private language schools beside French historical schools as Lycee El Horreya-Port Said.

English-language schools in Port Said are the most popular; those in the city include; Port Said International School and NIS International School.

=== Literacy and adult education ===
Port Said Governorate recorded the lowest illiteracy rate among Egypt’s governorates, at a rate of about 6.4% in 2023. The governorate has launched an executive plan to reduce illiteracy rates in cooperation with the Adult Education Authority with the aim of declaring the governorate free of illiteracy by the end of 2026.

== Healthcare ==
Port Said's healthcare sector is based on its pioneering role in implementing Egypt's Comprehensive Health Insurance System, which has contributed to modernizing local facilities and expanding medical coverage.

The city boasts several accredited hospitals managed by the General Authority for Healthcare, in addition to private clinics, including; Al Salam Hospital Port Said, Al Shifa Medical Complex, Al Nasr Specialized Hospital, Port Said University Hospital, and Eye Hospital. Specialized clinics such as ALEIADA and Medical Health Clinics offer private consultations in fields such as dermatology, orthopedics, and dentistry.

== Transport ==
=== Port ===
The port of Port Said is the 28th-busiest seaport for container transport, the second-busiest in the Arab world (narrowly behind the port of Salalah in Oman), and the busiest container seaport in Egypt, with 3,470,000 TEU transported in 2009. The port is part of the Maritime Silk Road. It is divided into:

- Port Said Port
- East Port Said Port

The port is bordered, seaward, by an imaginary line from the western breakwater boundary till the eastern breakwater end. And from the Suez Canal area, it is bordered by an imaginary line extending transversely from the southern bank of the Canal connected to Manzala Lake, and the railways arcade livestock.

==== Navigation channels ====
Main channel

- Length: 8 km (5 mi)
- Depth: 13.72 m (45.01 ft)

East verge channel

- Length: 19.5 km (12 mi)
- Depth: 18.29 m (60.01 ft)

==== Approach area ====
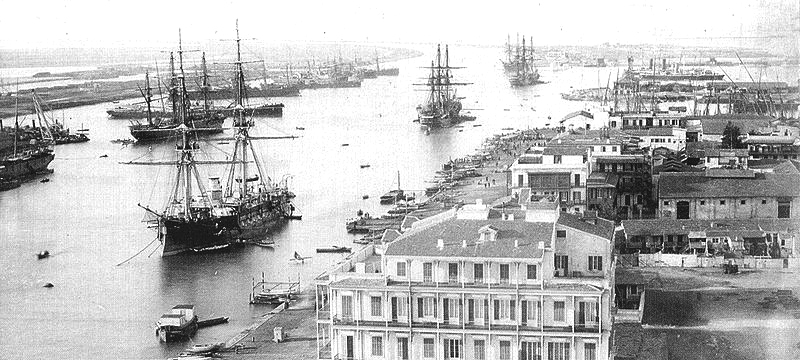
Port Said Canal in 1880

Two breakwaters protect the port entrance channel: the western breakwater is about 3.5 mi (5.6 km) long, and the eastern breakwater is approximately 1.5 mi (2.4 km).

==== Dwelling area ====
The Suez Canal Dwelling Area is situated between latitudes 31° 21' N and 31° 25' N and longitudes 32° 16.2°' E and 32° 20.6' E. where vessels awaiting to accede Port Said port stay whether to join the North convoy to transit the Suez Canal to carry out stevedoring operations or to be supplied with provisions and bunkers. The dwelling area is divided into two sections: The Northern Area is allocated for vessels with deep drafts. The Southern Area is for all vessel types.

=== Air ===
Port Said is served by Port Said Airport located about 6 km (3.7 mi) away from city centre.

The airport was reopened in February 2011 after being modernised to be fit for international flights. Scheduled flights from the airport ceased in 1996.

=== Motor highways ===
There are three main highways that connect Port Said to other cities in Egypt:

- International Coastal Road – a 257 km (160 mi) east–west highway that connects Port Said to Alexandria along the Mediterranean coast.
- Desert Road – a 215 km (134 mi) north–south route via Al Ismaileya – Port Saeed and Masr – Al Ismaileya Desert Road from Port Said to Cairo.
- 30th June Axis – a 53 km (33 mi) north-south highway from Port Said to cairo.

=== Rail ===
The Port Said railway station is on Mustafa Kamal Street and was built around 1893 when the Egyptian Railway Authority extended service in the region.

There are frequent train services from Cairo, Alexandria and other main Egyptian cities to Port Said. The travel time between Cairo and Port Said is about four hours while the Alexandria – Port Said route can be covered in about six hours. Intercity passenger service is operated by Egyptian National Railways. Tickets can be reserved online using the Egyptian National Railways website.

=== Ferry ===
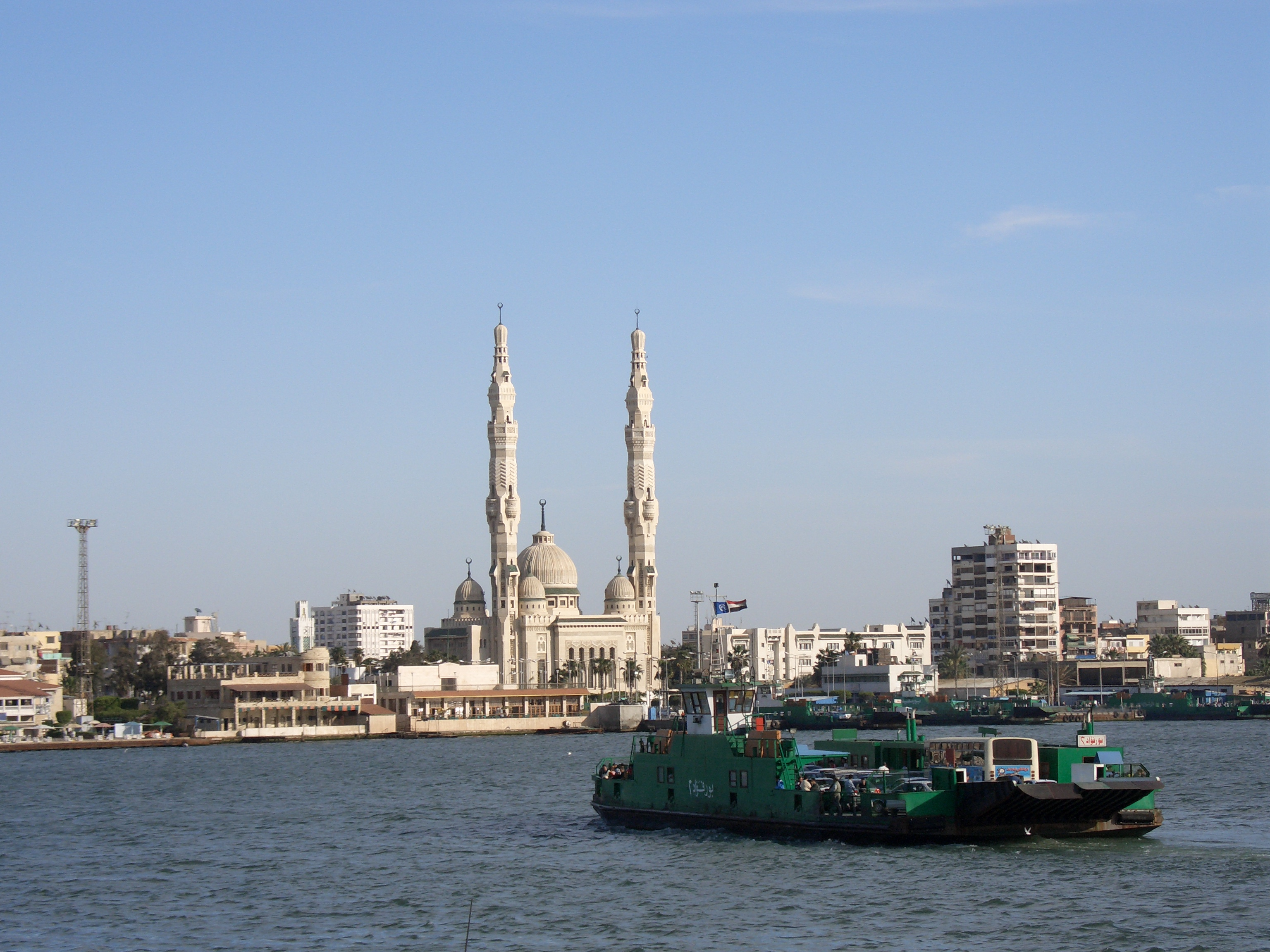
Ferry on its way to Port Fouad

Port Said is linked by ferry to its twin city Port Fouad which is considered the Asian part of this Afro-Asian governorate "Port Said" on the eastern bank of the Suez Canal, the ferry is used to cross the canal between the two cities, holding both people and cars as well (for free). The time between the two cities across the canal by using the ferry does not exceed 10 minutes.

=== Other means of public transport ===
Public buses are operated by Port Said Governorate's Agency for Public Passenger Transport. Private Transport also are available referred to as Micro Buses (14 seat minibus). White and blue saloon car taxicabs are comfortable, asking reasonable prices. Earlier trolleybuses existed in city.

== Culture ==
=== Libraries ===
The Misr Public Library in Port Said was founded in 2004. At the time of its inauguration reached about 14,000 books and was supplied by encyclopedias and modern references.

=== Theaters ===
Port Said has about 11 theatres.

- Port Said Opera House was inaugurated on 28 December 2016; here Egyptian music, classical music, opera and ballet are performed.

=== Museums ===
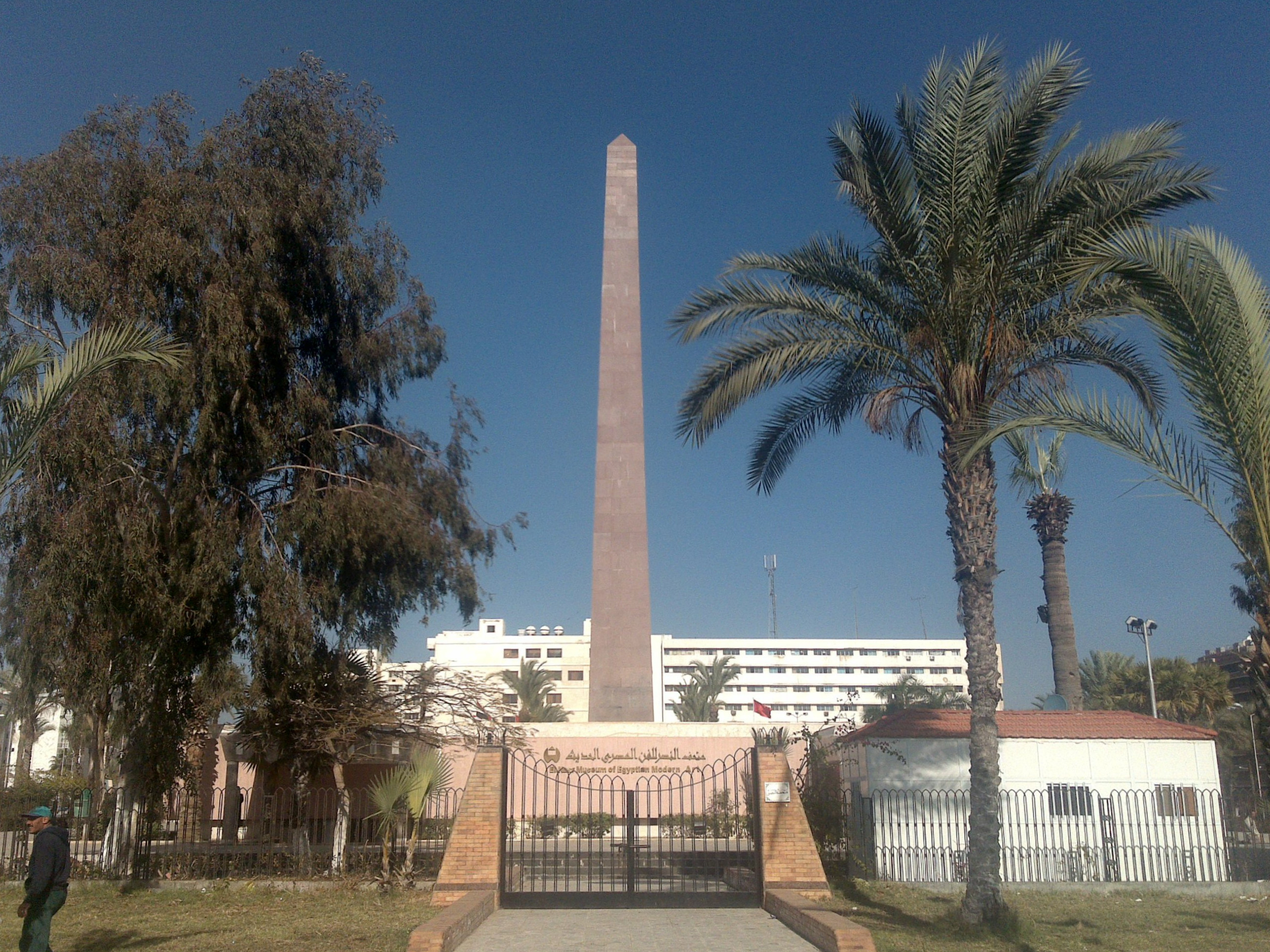
Museum of Modern Art—Port Said

- Port Said National Museum is located on Palestine Street in front of the tourist jetty, near the centre of the city. It contains about 9,000 artifacts that narrate the story of Port Said and Egypt.
- Port Said Military Museum was inaugurated in 1964. It is located in 23 July Street. It narrates the story of the Egyptian resistance in Port Said for the tripartite aggression during the Suez Crisis in 1956, and the wars of 1967 and 1973. It also contains a hall that narrates the genesis of the city and the Suez Canal.
- Museum of Modern Art—Port Said is a modern and contemporary art museum, located in Shohada Square, in Port Said, beneath the Obelisk of Martyrs.
- Museum of the Authority of the Suez Canal was inaugurated in August 2015. It narrates the story of the Suez Canal since its establishment.

=== Parks ===
Port Said has 23 parks, which include the Ferial Park (21,904 square meters), the Farma Park (12,469 square meters), the Khazanat Park (2,000 square meters), and the Aldawlia Park (8 hektars).

=== Sports ===
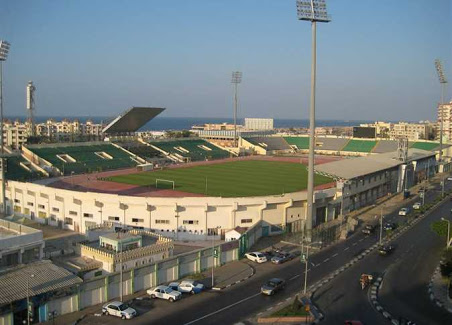
Al Masry Club Stadium

The main sport that interests Port Saidis is football, as is the case in the rest of Egypt and Africa, and Port Saidis are known for their enthusiasm in supporting the local team Al Masry SC.

Al Masry Club Stadium is a multi-purpose stadium in Port Said. Built in 1954, it currently seats 17,988 and is used mostly for football matches, including the 1997 FIFA U-17 World Championship, 2006 African Cup of Nations, and 2009 FIFA U-20 World Cup. The 2012 Port Said Stadium riot took place there.

The second most popular sport in Port Said is handball. The city is known for their local handball team Port Said SC that won three Egyptian Handball League titles and also was the champion of the African Handball Champions League in 1990.

Port Said Hall is an indoor hall located in the Sports City in Port Said. It hosts competitions of handball, basketball, and volleyball, and was used for the 1999 World Men's Handball Championship. It holds 5000 people.

Hockey, swimming, and other sports are also practiced on a lower scale.

=== Language ===
Among speakers of Egyptian Arabic, the Port Saidi accent is unique.

== International relations ==
=== Twin towns and sister cities ===
Port Said is twinned with:

- Volgograd, Russia (1962)
- Bizerte, Tunisia (1977)

== Notable people ==
- Abdel Rahman Shokry, Egyptian poet
- Abdulrahman Fawzi, former Egyptian player in Al Masry and Zamalek SC, participated in the 1934 FIFA World Cup
- Ahmed El Shenawy, Egyptian football player
- Amr Diab, Egyptian singer and composer and best-selling Arab recording artist
- El-Sayed El-Dhizui, former Egyptian player in Al Masry and one of the top scorers in the Egyptian Premier League
- Faiza Abou el-Naga, former ambassador and minister of planning and international cooperation
- George Isaac, Egyptian activist
- Giorgos Skalenakis, Greek Film director and actor
- Hans Dijkstal, Dutch politician, former Deputy Prime Minister
- Hany Abo Rida, president of Egyptian Football Association, member of the FIFA Council and a member of CAF Executive Committee
- Hoda Al-Ajimi, radio presenter
- Ibrahim El Batout, Egyptian director
- Ibrahim El-Masry, professional football player with Al Masry
- Kamal Darwish, former president of Zamalek SC
- Mahmoud Yassin, Egyptian actor
- Mohamed M. Atalla, engineer, inventor of MOS transistor, founder of Atalla Corporation
- Mohamed Shawky, professional football player with Al Ahly
- Mohamed Zidan, professional football player with Borussia Dortmund
- Mosaad Nour, former Egyptian player in Al Masry SC "the historic star of the team"
- Soheir Ramzi, Egyptian actress
- Yves F. Barbaza, born in Port Said, French World War I flying ace, credited with five aerial victories

== See also ==
- Closure of the Suez Canal (1956–1957)
- Closure of the Suez Canal (1967–1975)
- Container transport
- Egypt Carrying the Light to Asia
- List of cities and towns in Egypt
