= Museum of Modern Art of Barranquilla =

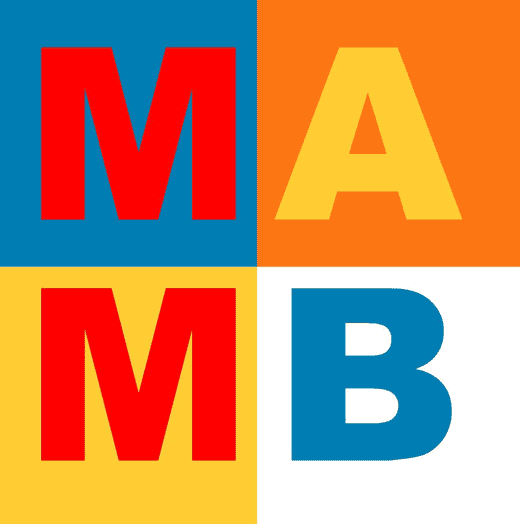

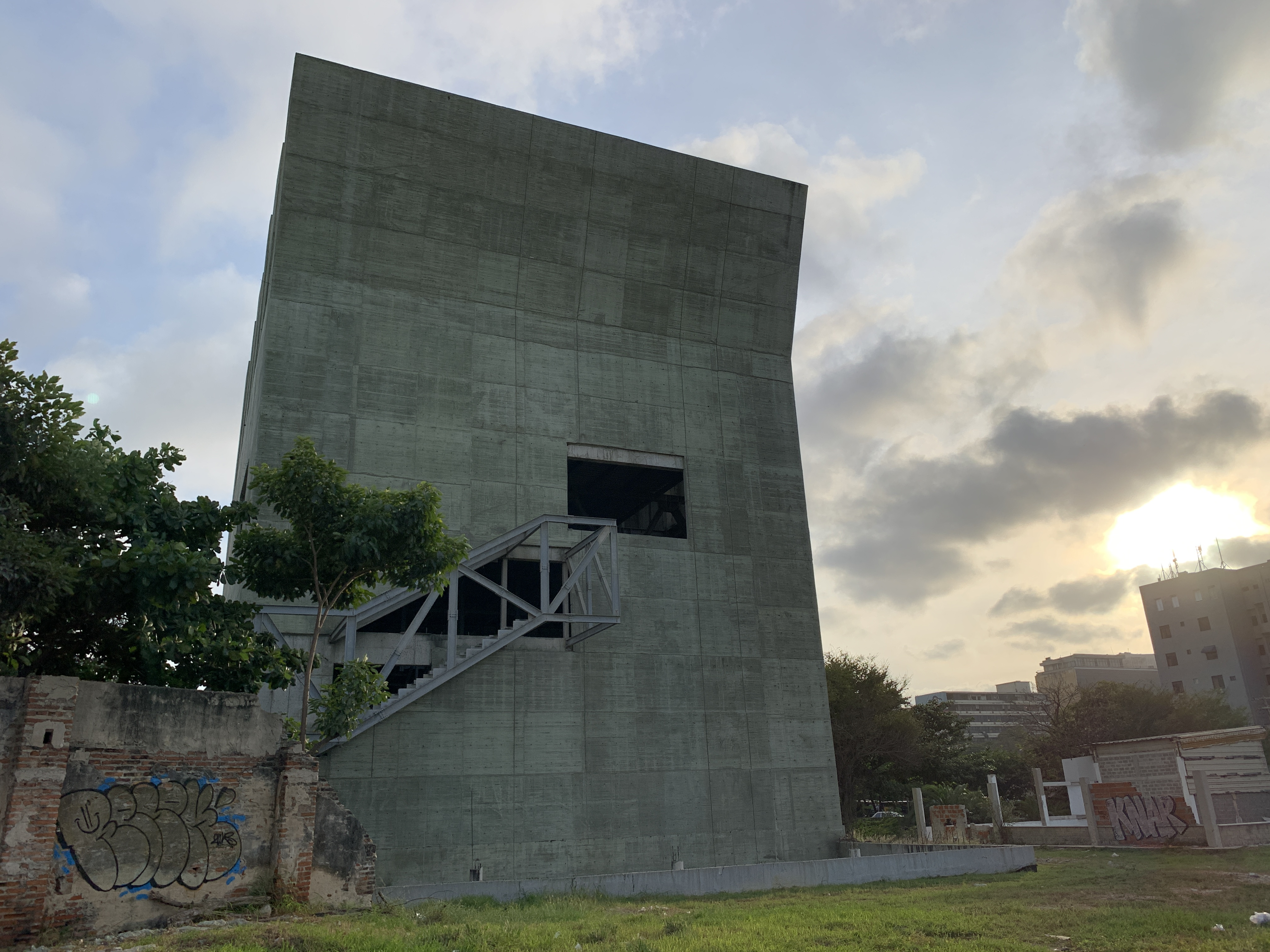
- Museum of Modern Art of Barranquilla
- Established: 1994
- Coordinates: 10.98685°N 74.77808°W
- Collection size: + 400
- Director: María Eugenia Castro
- President: Filiberto Mancini
- Website: mambq.org

The Museum of Modern Art of Barranquilla (in Spanish: Museo de Arte Moderno de Barranquilla)(MAMB) is a private cultural center in Barranquilla. It was inaugurated in 1994, though it had been active since 1974, hosting various national and international art exhibitions. The cultural venue also features a library, an auditorium, and a modern exhibition hall displaying works by prominent artists such as Fernando Botero, Karel Appel, Ángel Loochkartt, Enrique Grau, Alejandro Obregón, and Salvador Dalí, among others. The museum also organizes activities such as festivals, urban art events, talks, educational programs, and family gatherings, all aimed at promoting culture and art.

== Collection ==
The museum holds more than 400 works and is part of the Colombian Museum Association. It also actively participates in various cultural events, such as the Ibero-American Museum Meeting, and Heritage Week, among others.

It was planned that before the end of 2015, the Museum of Modern Art of Barranquilla would be permanently relocated to the former Caribbean Cultural Park. The project was supported by President Juan Manuel Santos, while other government entities such as the Ministry of Culture and the National Planning Department were involved in the studies.

Within the new facilities of the Museum of Modern Art of Barranquilla, a mural by painter Alejandro Obregón called Cosas del aire (Things of the Air) will be featured, serving as "the central piece of the five-story route that the MAMB will offer."

== Relocation ==
For 18 years, the Museum of Modern Art of Barranquilla was located in the building at Carrera 56 # 74 - 22. In 2022, the museum had to vacate the building, which had been loaned by Terpel, and is awaiting relocation to its new site on the premises of the former Caribbean Cultural Park. Its collection is currently stored in the Coltabaco building. The investment for the relocation to the cultural complex amounts to $ 10 billion. The new facility consists of six floors and 3,000 square meters; the architect Giancarlo Mazzanti was responsible for its design. The infrastructure will include an auditorium, a cultural shop, an exhibition hall, and a cinematheque.

== Incident ==
In 2012, the museum was the scene of a theft in which seven sculptures by artist Noemí Pérez were stolen. The pieces were made from mineral coal and depicted well-known structures both nationally and internationally, including the Empire State Building (two replicas), the Chrysler Building (two replicas), the Coit Tower in San Francisco (two replicas), and one of the Coltejer Tower. This was the first and only theft in the museum's history.
