= Gallery of Modern Art =

Gallery of Modern Art may refer to:

- Galleria d'Arte Moderna, Bologna, Italy
- Gallery of Modern Art, Brisbane, Australia
- Gallery of Modern Art, Florence, Italy, housed in the Palazzo Pitti
- Gallery of Modern Art, Glasgow, Scotland, UK
- Gallery of Modern Art, New York City, which operated 1964–1969 in the building now known as 2 Columbus Circle
- Washington Gallery of Modern Art, former gallery in Washington, D.C.

== See also ==
- Galleria Comunale d'Arte Moderna, Rome
- Museum of Modern Art (disambiguation)
- National Gallery of Modern Art (disambiguation)
