= Ángel Loochkartt =

Colombian visual artist (1933–2019)

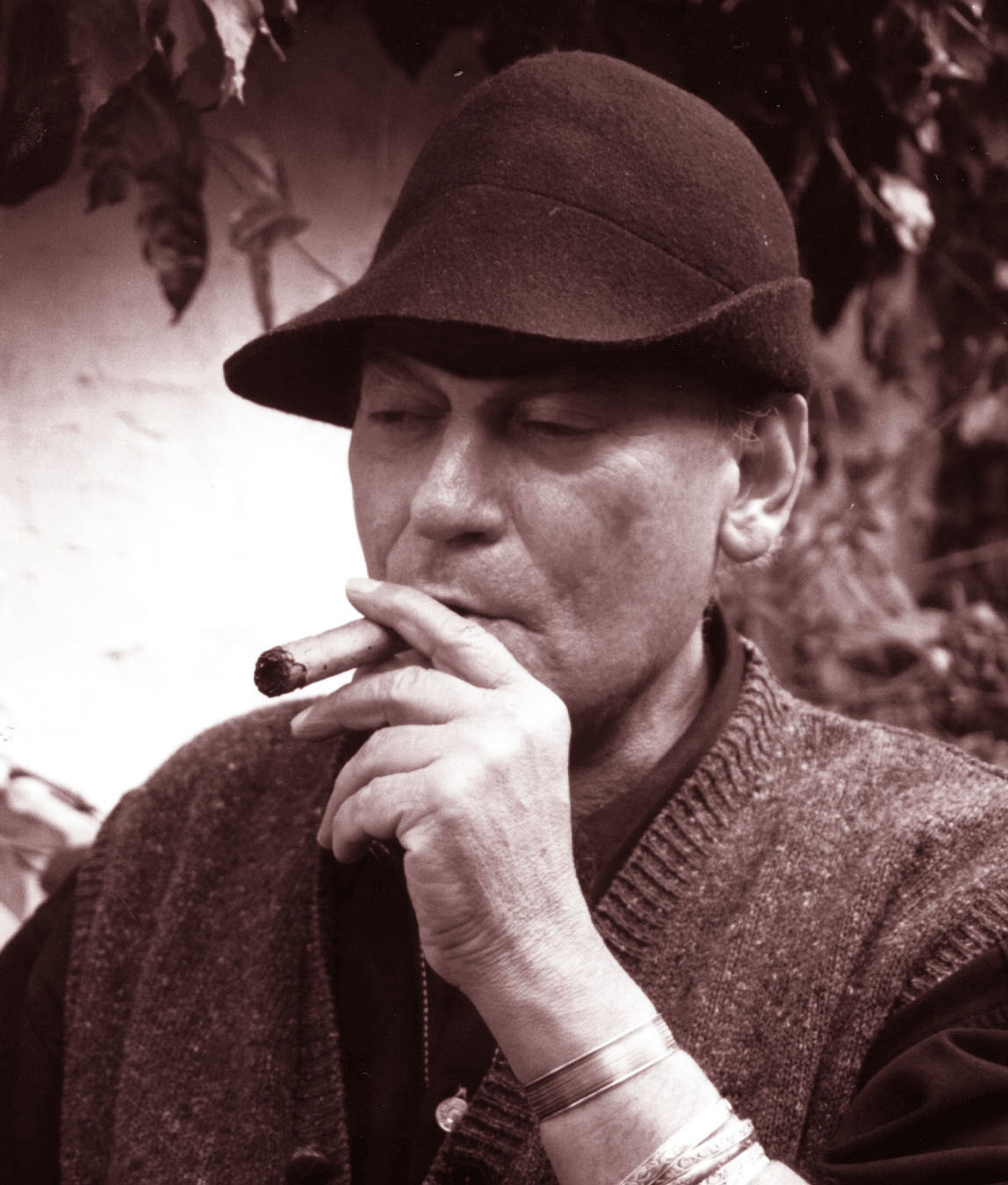
Photo of Ángel Loochkartt

Ángel Loochkartt (Barranquilla, May 19, 1933 – Bogotá, November 8, 2019) was a Colombian visual artist.

== Early life and education ==
Born in Bogotá, Loochkartt studied fine arts in Rome, where he learned mural techniques, easel painting, and engraving.

== Career ==
In 1971, he joined the Department of Fine Arts at the National University of Colombia, where he worked for two decades. He received the First Prize at the National Salon of Colombian Artists in 1986, the Honorable Mention at the Azuza Art Festival in California (U.S., 1961), the Medal of Merit from the Leonardo da Vinci Foundation (Bogotá, 1977), the Cristóbal Colón Award from the Planetarium of Bogotá (1986), the Life and Work Award from the Barranquilla Secretariat of Culture in 2011, and was the central honoree of the Barranquilla Arts Carnival in 2013.

Loochkartt exhibited his works in Italy, France, the United States, Mexico, and Colombia. He was part of the Colombian Expressionism group, alongside Leonel Góngora, Carlos Granada, Pedro Alcántara Herrán, Antonio Samudio, and Augusto Rendón. His use of color, large-scale erotic angels, figures referencing the Barranquilla Carnival (Congos (costumes with large turbans), Marimondas (another icon of Carnival)), transvestites, and nocturnal characters, along with an exploration of faces that are reminiscent of Goya, position him as one of the most internationally recognized Latin American artists.

His paintings have illustrated three books in the International Literature Collection Los Conjurados and Con-Fabulación 100. The magazine Común Presencia dedicated an extensive tribute to his work in issue 11. In a survey conducted in 2009 by the Museum of Erotic Art of America and Con-Fabulación, with the participation of hundreds of critics and intellectuals, he was ranked seventh among the most outstanding Colombian visual artists of all time.

=== Subject matter ===
During the 1960s, Loochkartt began his exploration of individuals active in the night, featuring transsexuals, criminals, prostitutes, beggars, tango dancers, and carnival figures, many of which became part of Colombia's artistic imagination. His works have appeared on numerous book covers, magazines, and widely circulated posters, including one for the 2010 Barranquilla Carnival and The Angel of the Bicycle, which was used to promote the Bogotá Literature Festival in 2010.

His use of trembling skin tones, the depiction of shadowed faces marked by danger, and the dynamic composition of figures characterized by movement and emotional intensity demonstrate a refined mastery of line and color, exerting a significant influence on subsequent generations of artists. His figures embody a tangible presence, often depicted under a stigma that ranges from harsh to surreal, representing characters rooted in nocturnal themes. A decade later, adhering to his distinctive artistic vision, he introduced the "Malsentadas" collection, which explores femininity through vibrant color and a dynamic, playful approach.

Since the beginning of his career, graphic work has played a major role in his artistic journey. Proficient in engraving and serigraphy, he created series featuring the Congos of the Barranquilla Carnival, guardian angels, and exterminating archangels. Among his masterpieces are "Ángel Laruel" and "Spoken Portrait of Christ," some of his last creations.

=== Honors ===
In 2014, he was awarded the title of emeritus professor by the National University of Colombia for his contributions to academia.
