= National Gallery of Modern Art (disambiguation) =

National Gallery of Modern Art is an art gallery in New Delhi, India

National Gallery of Modern Art may also refer to:

- National Gallery of Modern Art, Mumbai, India
- National Gallery of Modern Art, Bangalore, India
- National Gallery of Modern Art, Lagos, Nigeria
- Galleria Nazionale d'Arte Moderna, Rome, Italy
- Scottish National Gallery of Modern Art, Scotland, UK

== See also ==
- Gallery of Modern Art (disambiguation)
