= Museum of Modern Art—Port Said =

Art museum in Port Said, Egypt

Coordinates: 31.26°N 32.29°E

Museum of Modern Arts
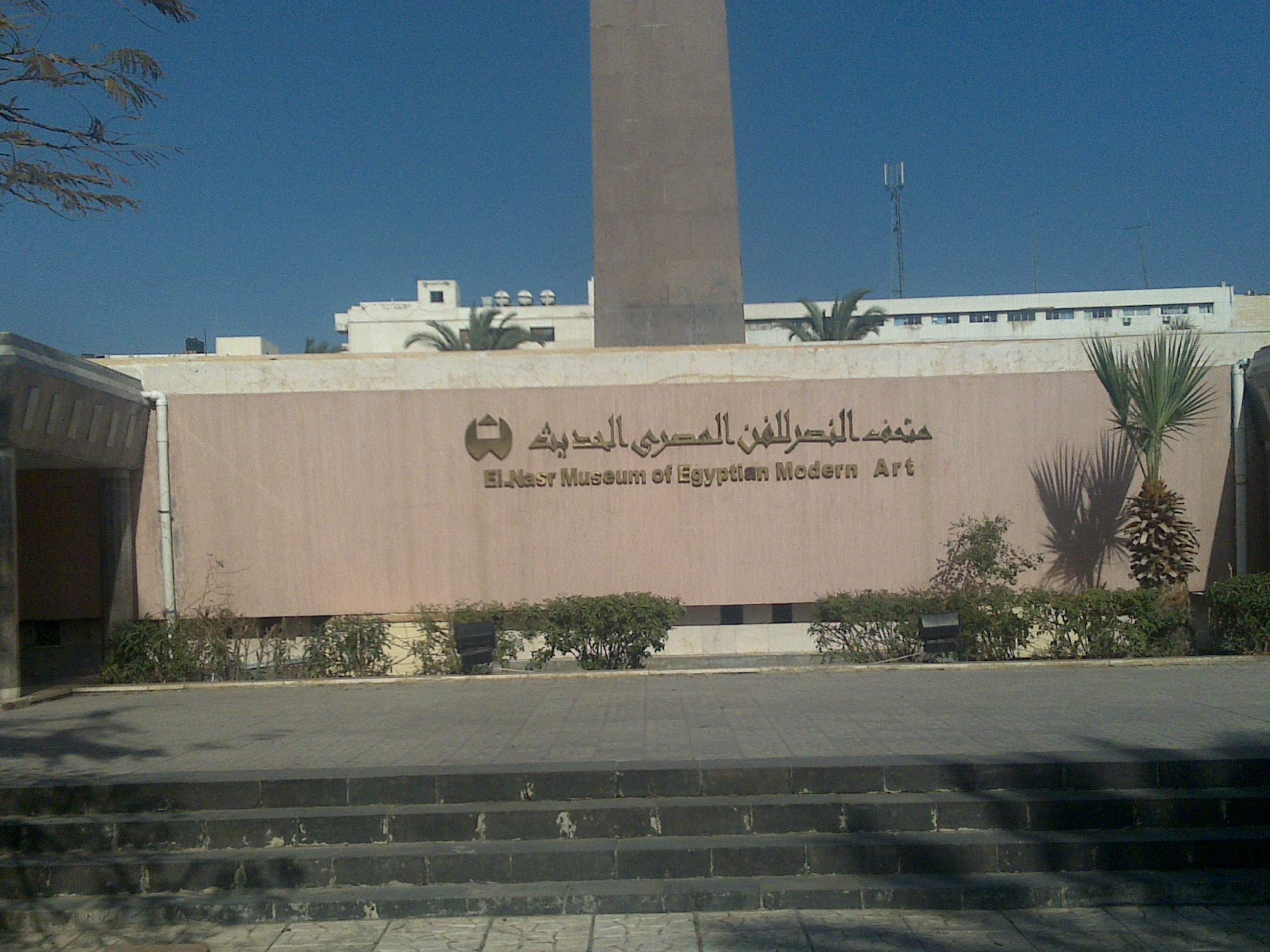
- Museum entrance
- Established: 1995
- Location: Port Said, Egypt
- Type: Contemporary art

Museum of Modern Art—Port Said is a modern and contemporary art museum, located in Shohada Square, in Port Said, Egypt. The city of Port Said has an international history of being a cultural crossroads and cosmopolitan community, located at the confluence of the Suez Canal and Mediterranean Sea, on the easternmost edge of the Nile Delta region.

== Collection ==
The Museum of Modern Art in Port Said opened in 1995 and displays a collection of contemporary paintings, graphics, drawings, and ceramics created by Egyptian artists.

== See also ==
- Index: Egyptian artists

== Notes ==
The similarly named but separate modern art institution, the 'Egyptian Modern Art Museum' or 'Gezira Center for Modern Art,' is located at the National Cultural Centre near the Cairo Opera House, on Gezira Island in central Cairo.
