= Stephano-Sub-Vosgian Coal Basin =

Coal basin in France

Location of the deposit on the map of French coal basins.

The Stephano-Sub-Vosgian coal basin, part of the coalfields of the Vosges and Jura, is located in eastern France and spans the Eastern Haute-Saône, the Territoire de Belfort, and the southern Haut-Rhin. Dating from the Stephanian geological stage, only its central-western section, corresponding to the Ronchamp and Champagney mining area, was extensively mined between the mid-18th and mid-20th centuries due to the quality of its coal seams. Other areas were largely unexploited or minimally developed because of excessive depth (over one kilometer) or the low quality and thickness of the coal seams.

A small coal deposit near the hamlet of Mourière was exploited between 1844 and 1891 on an artisanal scale, characterized by thin and low-quality seams. In the early 20th century, significant coal reserves with sufficiently thick and higher-quality seams were identified near the commune of Saint-Germain. However, the onset of World War I and the subsequent Great Depression delayed potential development. Despite further discussions and proposals during the 1950s, no mining operations were initiated. Between 1757 and 1914, six mining concessions were granted in the region. Three were eventually consolidated (Ronchamp, Champagney, and Éboulet), one remained a small-scale operation (Mourière), and two were never developed (Lomont and Saint-Germain).

== Location ==
Concessions in Haute-Saône.: Haute-Saône Keuperian / Saint-Germain; Mourière / Lomont; Éboulet / Ronchamp

The Stephano-Sub-Vosgian coal basin, characterized by a boomerang shape, extends across the eastern Haute-Saône, the northern Territoire de Belfort, and the southern Haut-Rhin. It stretches from Bouhans-lès-Lure, Ronchamp, and Lomont in the west to Wattwiller in the east, with scattered outcrops between Romagny and Habsheim. The basin measures approximately 60 kilometers in length along the Vosges range and up to 20 kilometers in width.

The western portion of the Stephano-Sub-Vosgian coal basin was divided into six concessions: Ronchamp, Champagney, and Éboulet in the northern sector, which were eventually merged along with the operating companies; Mourière, which remained independent; Lomont in the south, which was not developed due to insufficient financial and technical resources for deep mining; and Saint-Germain. The extensive eastern sector did not receive any concessions Nevertheless, it was explored by various companies, including the "Haut-Rhin departmental company for coal exploration." Some limited and short-term artisanal exploration and extraction efforts occurred sporadically across the region.

The nearest coalfields to the Stephano-Sub-Vosgian basin are the Villé Valley basin to the northeast and the Keuperian coal basin of Haute-Saône, which partially overlaps it to the southwest.

== Geology ==
Deposit formation.

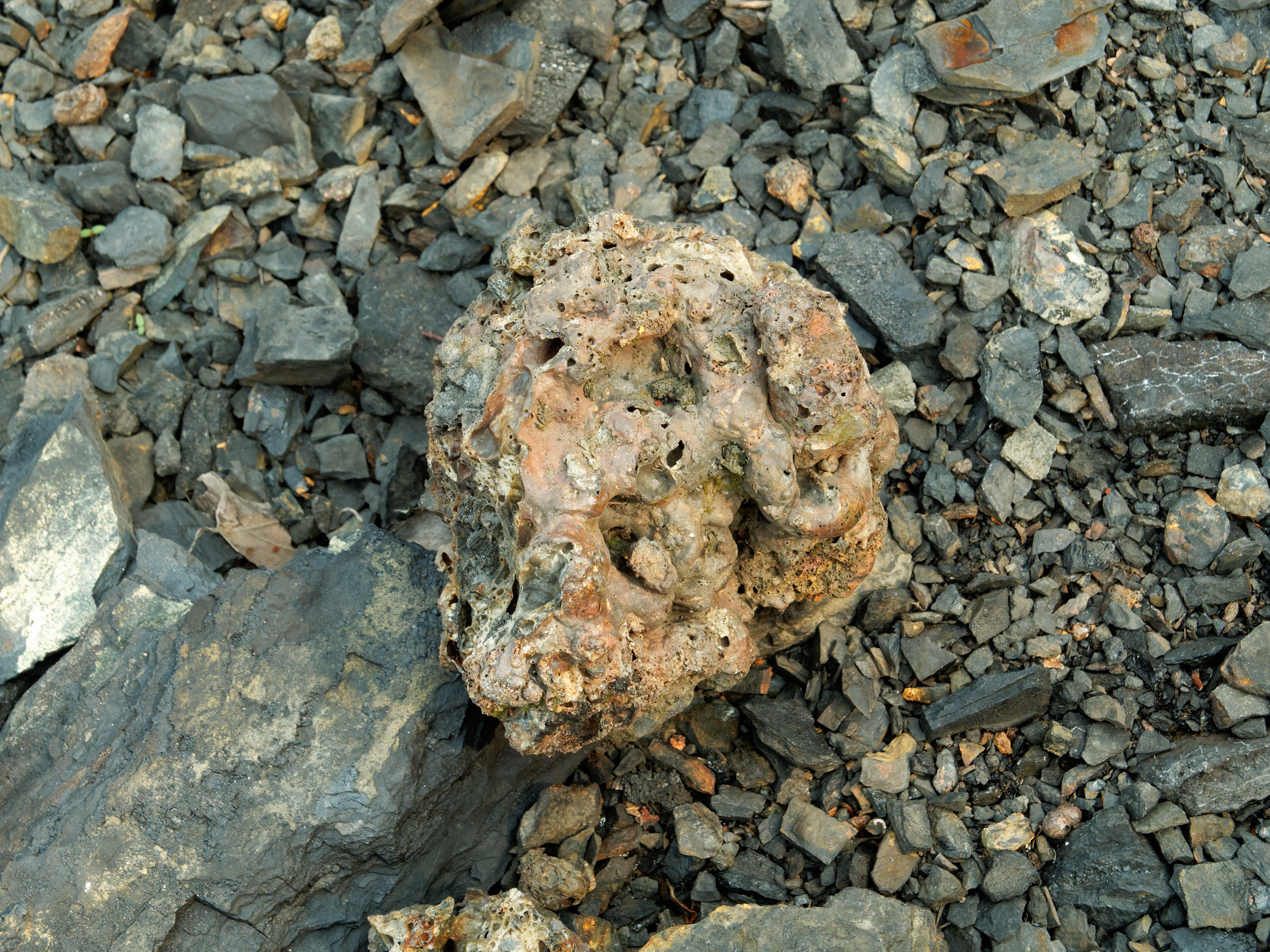
Example of rocks forming the slag heaps at Ronchamp.

During the Devonian period, the bedrock of the Belfort region, located along the edge of the Vosges Massif, was formed through detrital sedimentation. In the Carboniferous period, the area was submerged under a sea, leading to marine sedimentation and associated volcanic activity. The coal basin began forming during the Stephanian stage (approximately 307 to 299 million years ago), under layers of fluvio-lacustrine sediments. In the Permian period, the deposit underwent folding and was subsequently overlaid by additional detrital sediments originating from the erosion of the Variscan orogen.

The spoil tips of the Ronchamp and Champagney mining basin contain numerous Carboniferous-period fossils. These include plant species characteristic of both dry, mountainous environments (such as black thorn, ferns, and cordaites) and swampy plains, such as Lepidodendron, Sigillaria, Calamites, and Sphenophyllum. Fossils of freshwater fish have also been found, indicating the presence of a large freshwater body during the period.

The deposit spans the Belfort Gap and the Sub-Vosgian depression. It comprises several basins, including Mourière and Ronchamp, Saint-Germain, Lomont, Roppe, and Romagny. The Ronchamp and Champagney basins contain the thickest coal seams. In contrast, the seams in the Lomont and Saint-Germain areas, as well as the entire eastern sector, are thin and affected by faulting. The basin dips approximately 20° from north to south and has a structure resembling a ship's hull, reaching depths exceeding one kilometer before rising sharply near the Chagey massif and the Jura massif.

Geologically, the Mourière deposit differs from that of Ronchamp despite being of the same age. The deposits exhibit different inclinations, and in Mourière, the coal seam lies directly on the bedrock. The coal in Mourière is clay-rich and contains pyrite, necessitating washing before sale. Further northwest, the Saint-Germain basin contains coal seams of similar quality to those in Ronchamp. These seams range in thickness from 0.60 to 2.50 meters, with an average just below one meter. The coal-bearing terrain is disrupted by three faults. The first is located south of Saint-Germain, where two drillings spaced 800 meters apart indicate a 42-meter difference in the Permian roof. The second fault lies beneath the Grand Morveau woods, north of Lure, where the dip of the seams becomes too steep. Coal samples from drillings No. 7 and 8 show an average composition of 50% carbon, 27% ash, 23% volatile matter, and a calorific value ranging from 2 to 8 kCAL (8.4 to 33.5 MJ/kg).

East of Saint-Germain, the Ronchamp deposit contains coal seams reaching up to four meters in thickness. It is located along the southern slope of the Vosges massif, with a southeastward dip of approximately 20°, extending toward Lomont, where depths exceed one kilometer. The coal is overlain by a Permian basin composed of red Vosges sandstone and various clay formations. In the Haute-Saône department, coal outcrops are limited to narrow strips north of the Ronchamp deposit, located deep within forested areas, which contributed to their late discovery. Seam thickness in this area varies from a few decimeters to four meters. Further east, the seams are generally of lower quality, appearing as discontinuous, faulted veinlets interspersed with schist. The Stephanian formation also outcrops at Roppe, Anjoutey, and Bourg (three municipalities northeast of Belfort) as well as south of Mélisey, near Lure.

== History ==
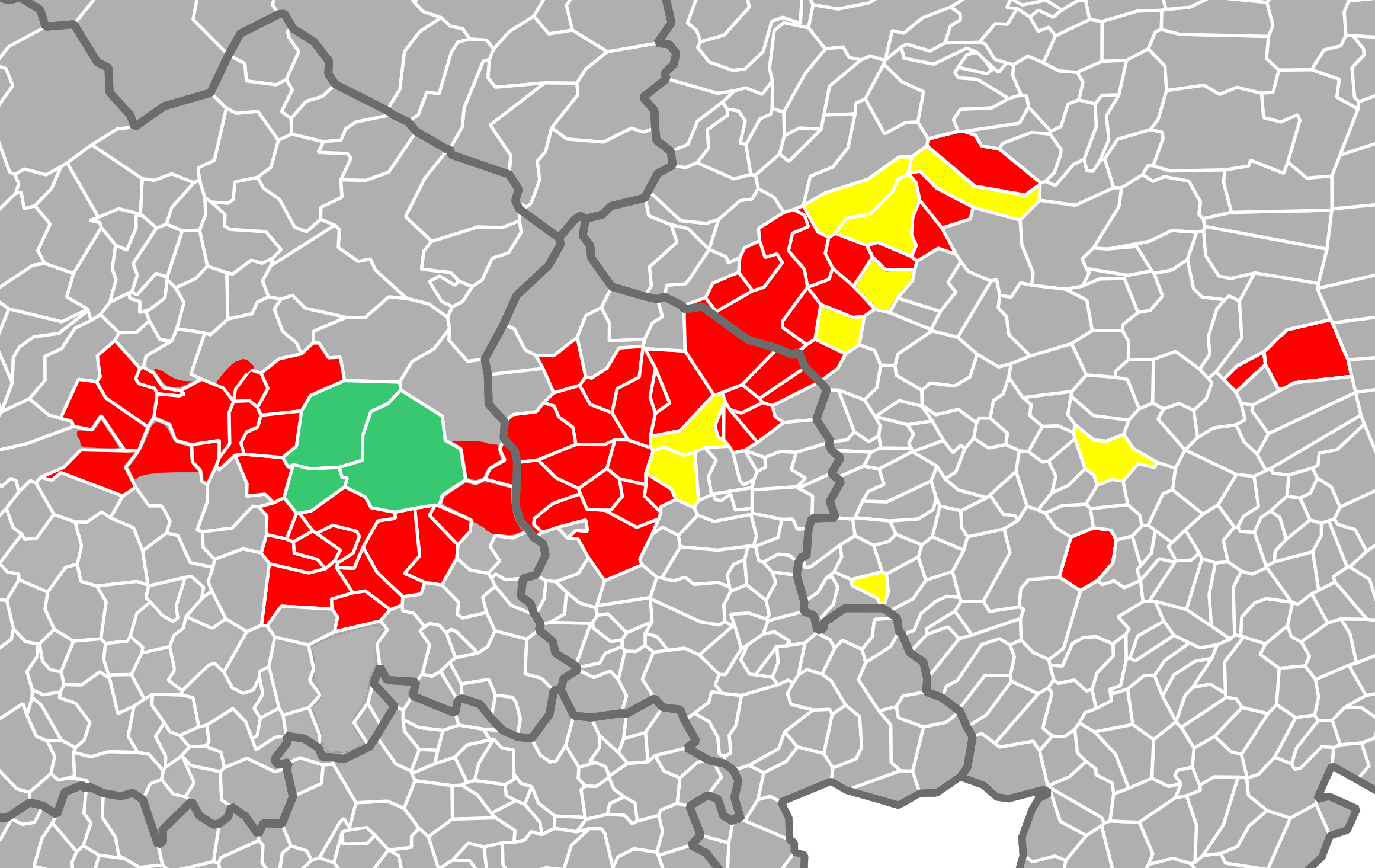
Municipalities in the Belfort area and neighboring departments where coal deposits have been identified. Industrial exploitation Artisanal attempt Unexploited List Industrial exploitation: Ronchamp, Champagney and Magny-Danigon Artisanal attempts: Anjoutey, Roppe, Étueffont, Thann, Bitschwiller-lès-Thann, Uffholtz, Sentheim, Romagny and Illfurth Unexploited: Mélisey, Saint-Germain, Froideterre, Lantenot, La Neuvelle-lès-Lure, Bouhans-lès-Lure, Rignovelle, Linexert, Franchevelle, Quers, Adelans, Belverne, Lomont, Courmont, Étobon, Clairegoutte, Magny-Jobert, Lyoffans, La Côte, Roye, Frédéric-Fontaine, Malbouhans, Saint-Barthélemy, Plancher-Bas, Frahier, Chenebier, Échavanne, Évette-Salbert, Sermamagny, Éloie, Lachapelle-sous-Chaux, Chaux, Giromagny, Rougegoutte, Grosmagny, Petitmagny, Rougemont, Mortzwiller, Lauw, Masevaux, Niederbruck, Bourbach-le-Haut, Bourbach-le-Bas, Vieux-Thann, Steinbach, Wattwiller, Roderen, Leimbach, Zimmersheim, Habsheim, Altkirch, Felon, Offemont, Valdoie and Belfort.

The coal basin was discovered around 1744 through outcrops in the hills above Ronchamp and Champagney. Mining operations began in 1757 with the granting of two concessions, which were merged in 1763. The Mourière concession was granted in 1766 but was not exploited until the period between 1844 and 1891. In 1810, the first mine shaft, named Saint-Louis, was sunk. During the same period, small-scale coal extraction also took place near Thann.

In 1820, a departmental company was established in the Haut-Rhin to promote coal exploration and reduce the Alsatian industry's dependence on wood and coal from Ronchamp. Between 1822 and 1832, exploration efforts were conducted, but the initiative was ultimately abandoned due to the limited size and unworkability of the region's coal deposits.

In 1840, the "cuvette de l'étançon" was depleted, and the Ronchamp deposit was considered exhausted by its concession owners. In 1843, coal was rediscovered by two industrialists from Haute-Saône who had acquired the concession. In 1847, the Société des maîtres de forges (Society of Ironmasters) was established and began exploration south of the Ronchamp concession. Both companies competed for a new concession, investing in drilling and exploratory shafts. The Éboulet concession was ultimately granted to the Ironmasters in 1862. Following operational difficulties, the Éboulet concession and its mining company were merged with those of Ronchamp. The consolidated company then entered a period of economic growth that continued until the First World War.

During the late 19th and early 20th centuries, the company managing the Ronchamp mining operations undertook evaluations to assess the remaining coal resources. In 1883 and 1906, the basin was assessed by the General Mining Engineer and geographer Pierre Termier, respectively. Both experts noted the basin's complex geology, including extensive faulting and uplift, the challenging depth of the southern sector, and the unworkable nature of the scattered seams to the east and west. Despite these limitations, they recommended continued exploration in more distant areas where additional deposits might exist. Throughout the 19th century, exploration extended eastward toward Belfort and Mulhouse, conducted by the Ronchamp company and independent operators. However, only small-scale, short-lived mining operations were established in these regions. Industrial coal extraction remained limited to the Ronchamp basin. In the early 20th century, two additional concessions were granted: the Lomont concession (1904) to the south and the Saint-Germain concession (1914) to the west of Ronchamp. The Lomont concession was never exploited due to technical challenges related to deep mining, while exploitation of the Saint-Germain concession was postponed due to World War I and subsequent unfavorable economic and strategic conditions. Both concessions remained unexploited into the early 21st century.

In the 1920s, the Ronchamp coalfields, which had sunk France's deepest mine shaft in 1900 (1,000 meters), entered a period of decline. Despite this, investments continued, and the area experienced an influx of Polish workers. After World War II, the mining operations were transferred to Électricité de France (EDF), which deemed them insufficiently profitable and considered closing them. In response, a mine defense committee was established and extended mining activities by eight years through the renewed extraction of outcrop coal. In 1954, the committee proposed creating the "Charbonnages de Franche-Comté" by exploiting the Jura coal basin and the two other concessions in Haute-Saône. This initiative was not implemented. Coal extraction in the basin ceased on May 3, 1958, with the removal of the final coal wagon. The Ronchamp concession, the first granted in the basin, was also the last to be relinquished, in 1961.

Lifespan of the Six Concessions
The shafts are colored according to their respective concessions; darker shades indicate periods of coal extraction, while lighter shades indicate other functions or dormant periods.

Champagney Concession
Ronchamp Concession
Mourière Concession
Éboulet Concession
Saint-Germain Concession
Lomont Concession

== Concessions ==
=== Ronchamp and Champagney ===
47.7000°N 6.6333°E

Two coal mining concessions were granted in 1757 following the discovery of coal around 1744: the concession to the lords of Ronchamp at Ronchamp (granted on 11 September 1757) and the concession to the prince-abbots of Lure at Champagney (granted on 21 April 1757). These two concessions were merged on 1 March 1763.

The Ronchamp deposit, which extends into the municipalities of Champagney and Magny-Danigon, was the most extensively exploited in the basin, with an estimated 16 to 17 million tons of coal extracted. It was also the longest-operating site, with industrial activity spanning from the 18th to the 20th century. The deposit significantly influenced the landscape, marked by slag heaps, mining infrastructure, and workers' housing, as well as the region's economy and demographics, including Polish immigration and the development of mining traditions.

Coal extraction initially took place through hillside galleries, before the Saint-Louis shaft was established in 1810 as the first vertical extraction shaft in the Ronchamp basin. As coal seams were located at greater depths, additional and increasingly deeper shafts were excavated. The Société civile des houillères de Ronchamp ultimately sank the deepest mine shafts in France at the time: the Magny shaft (694 meters) in 1878 and the Arthur-de-Buyer shaft (1,010 meters) in 1900. Following the nationalization of the mining sector in 1946, the operating shafts and the thermal power plant were transferred to Électricité de France.

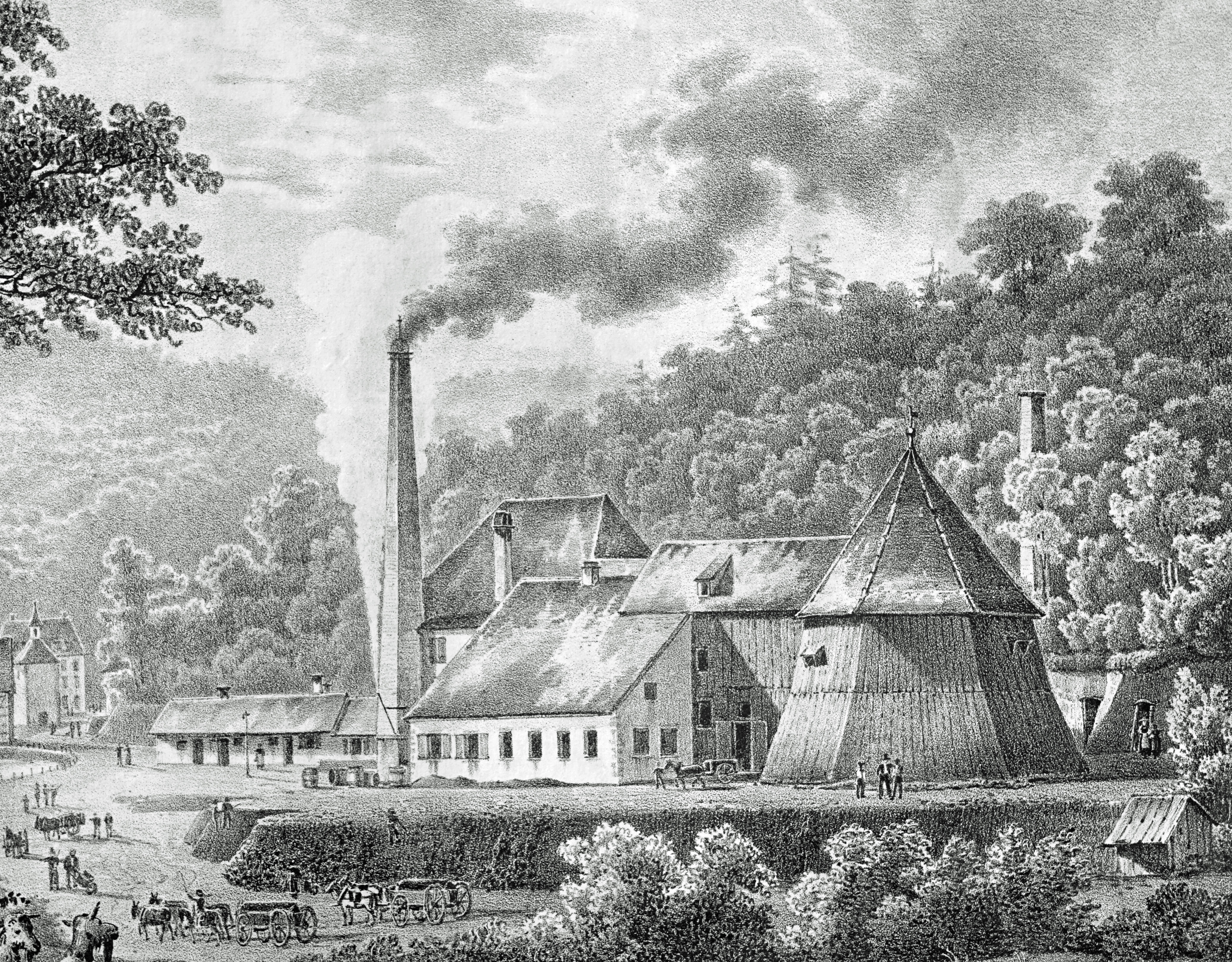
Saint-Louis shaft.

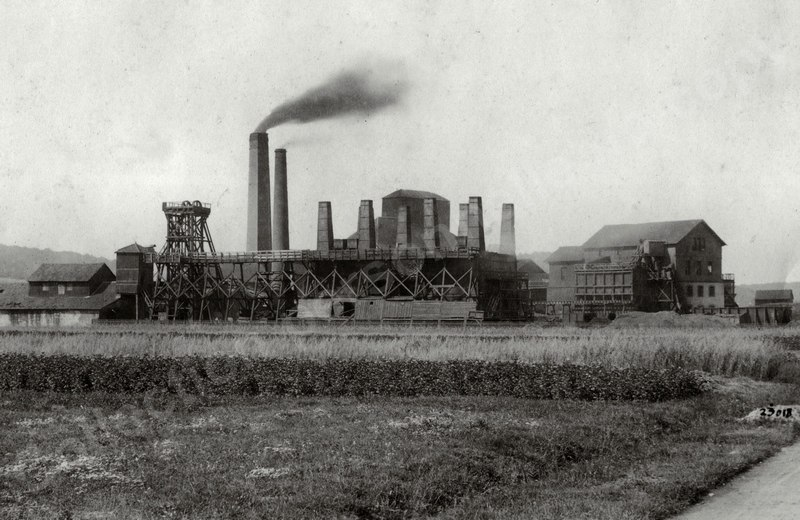
Saint-Joseph shaft and its coking plant (Appolt furnaces).

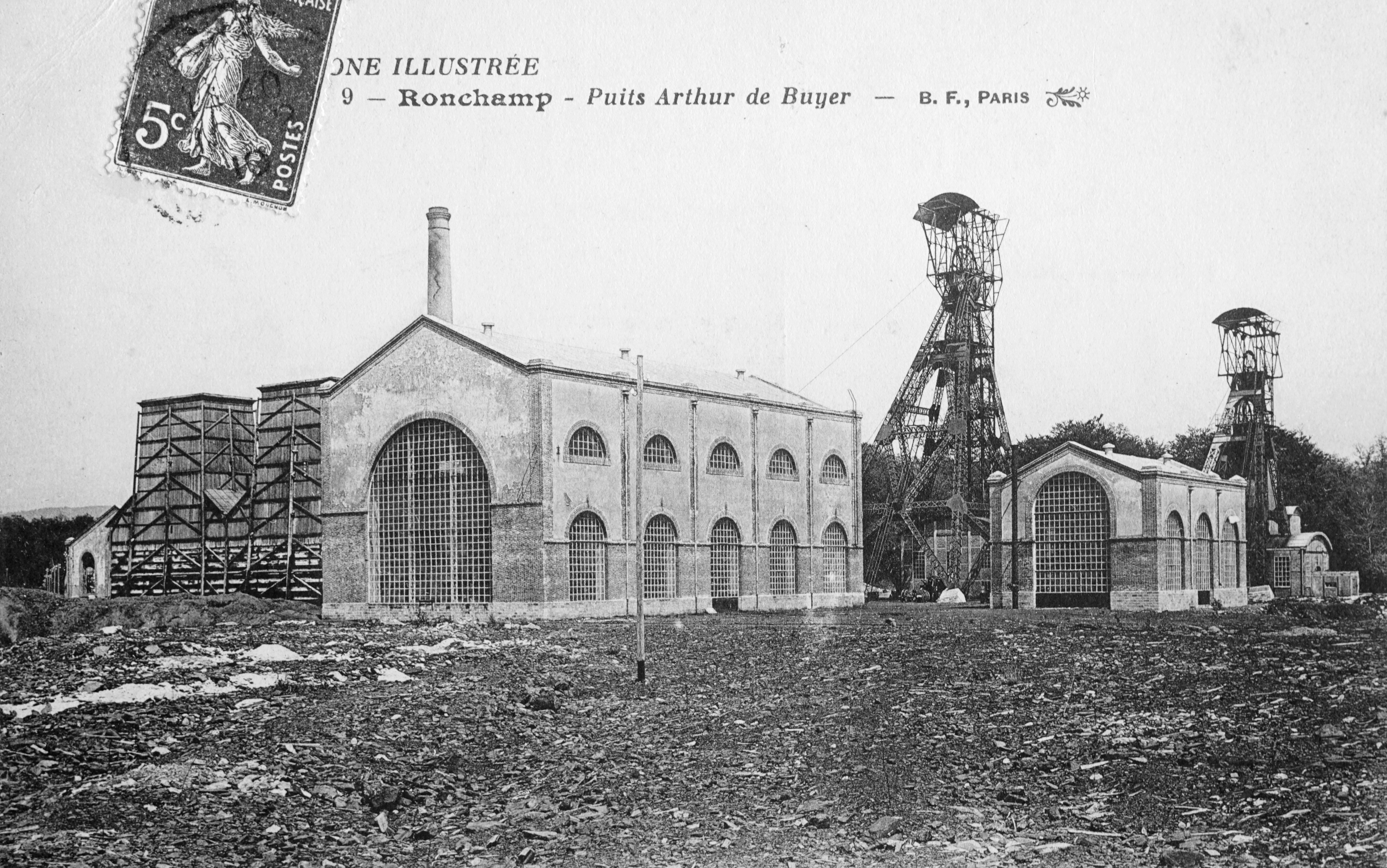
Arthur-de-Buyer shaft or shaft no. 11.

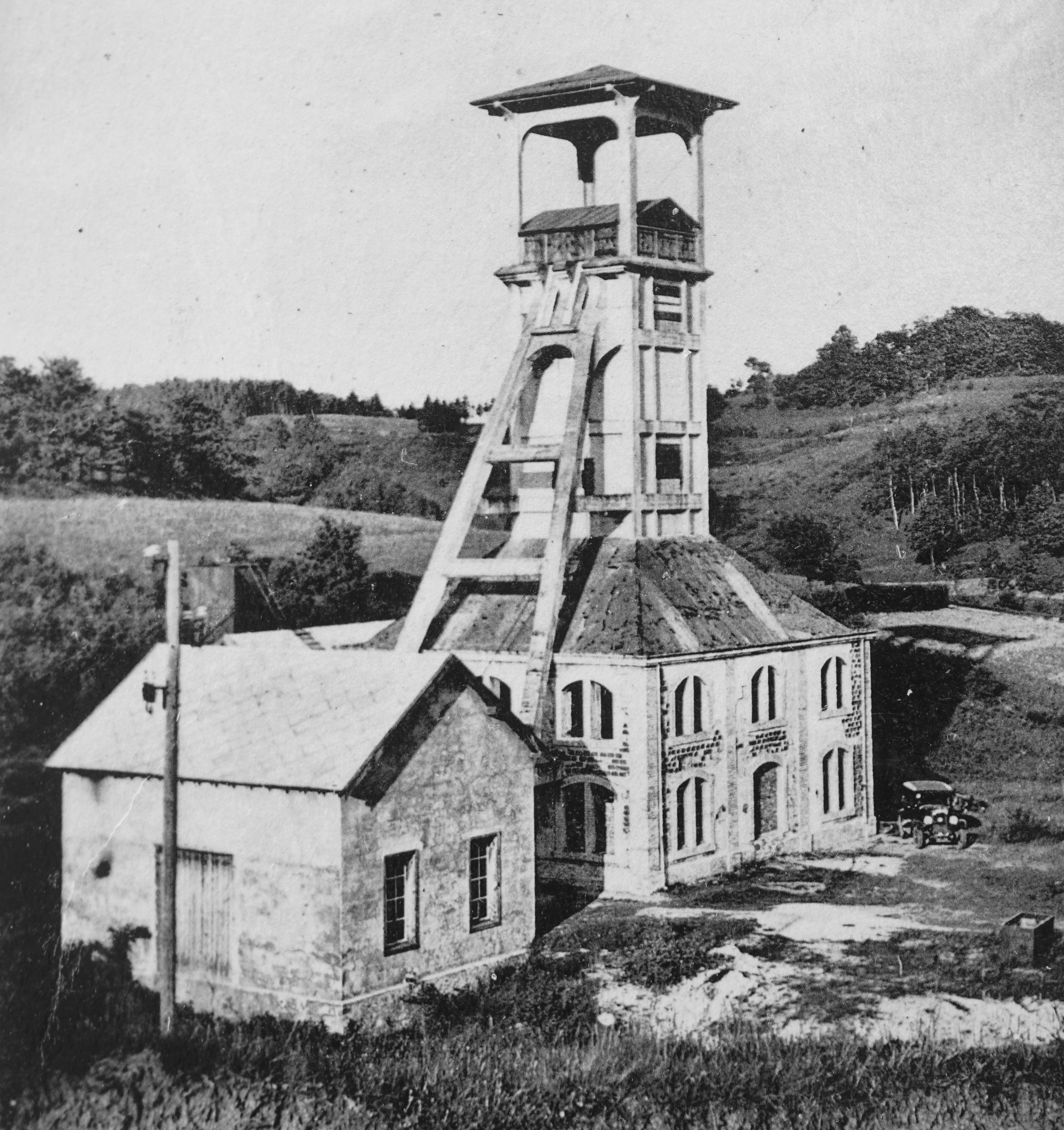
Sainte-Marie shaft.

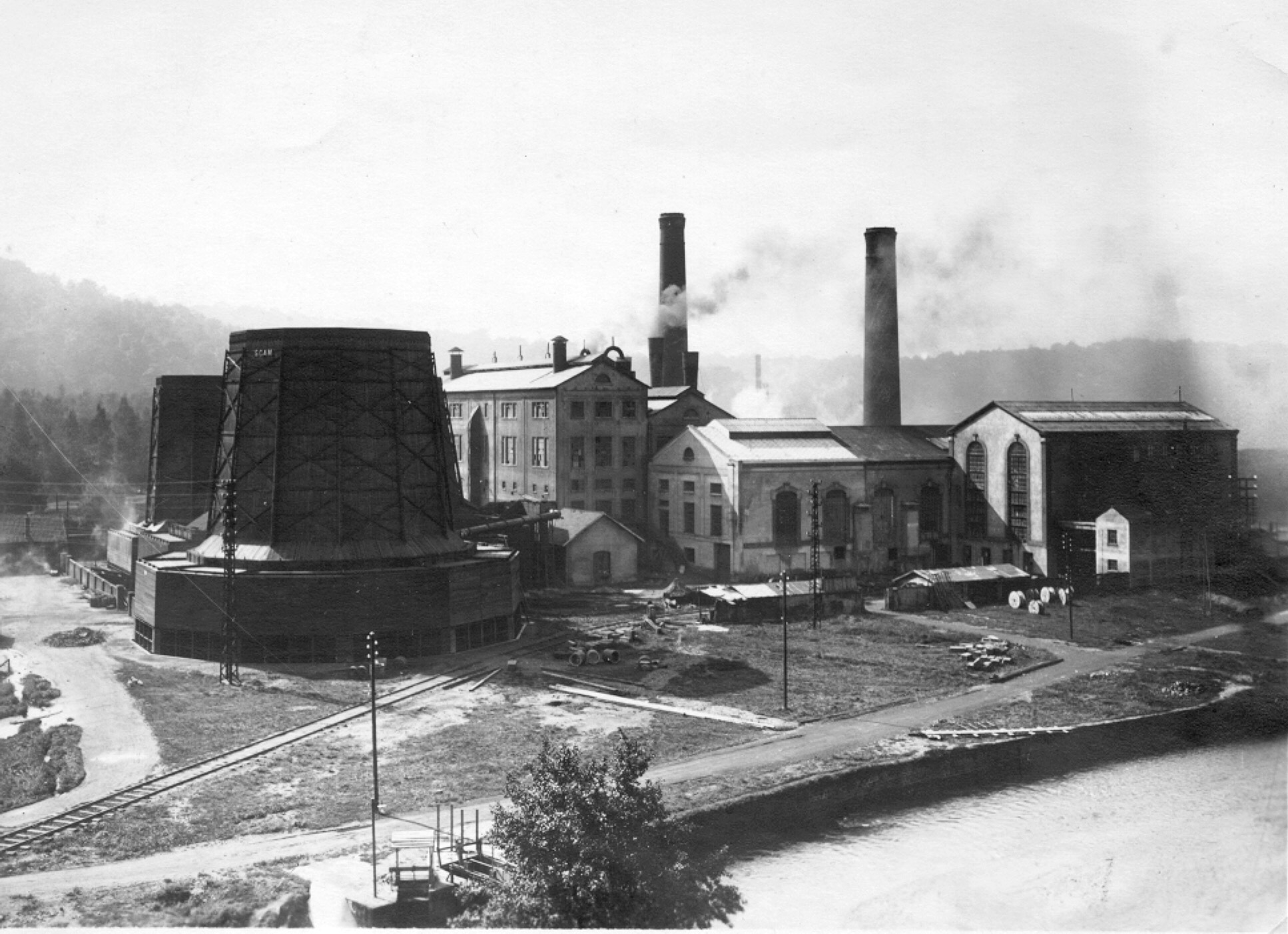
Thermal power plant.

Following the closure of the mines in 1958, the sites were secured, and most of the infrastructure was dismantled. Former miners were retrained for employment in other sectors. In the 1970s and 1990s, a museum and two associations were established to preserve the region's mining heritage. Several sites were subsequently redeveloped to facilitate public access and historical interpretation.

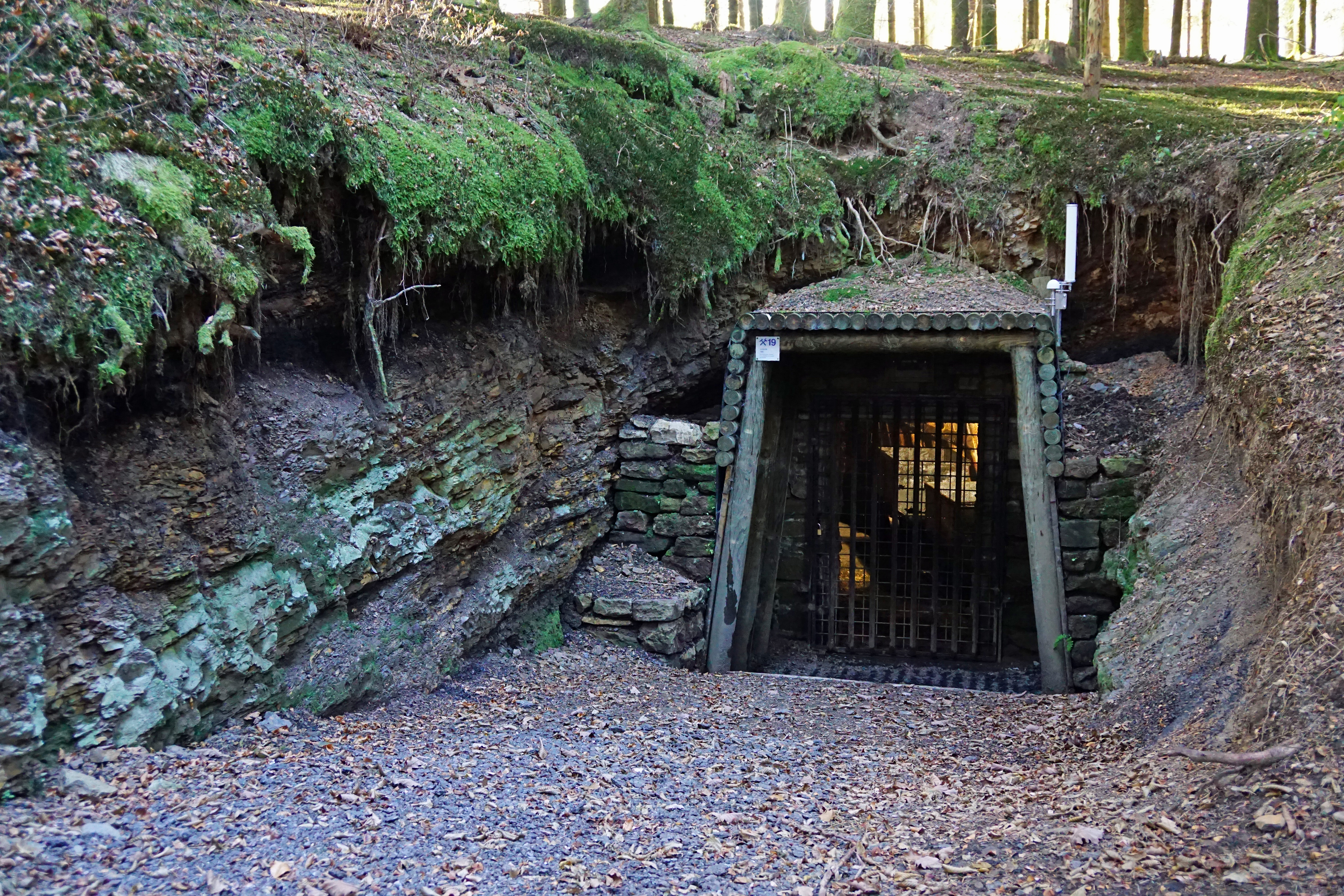
Gallery 780, at the outcrops.

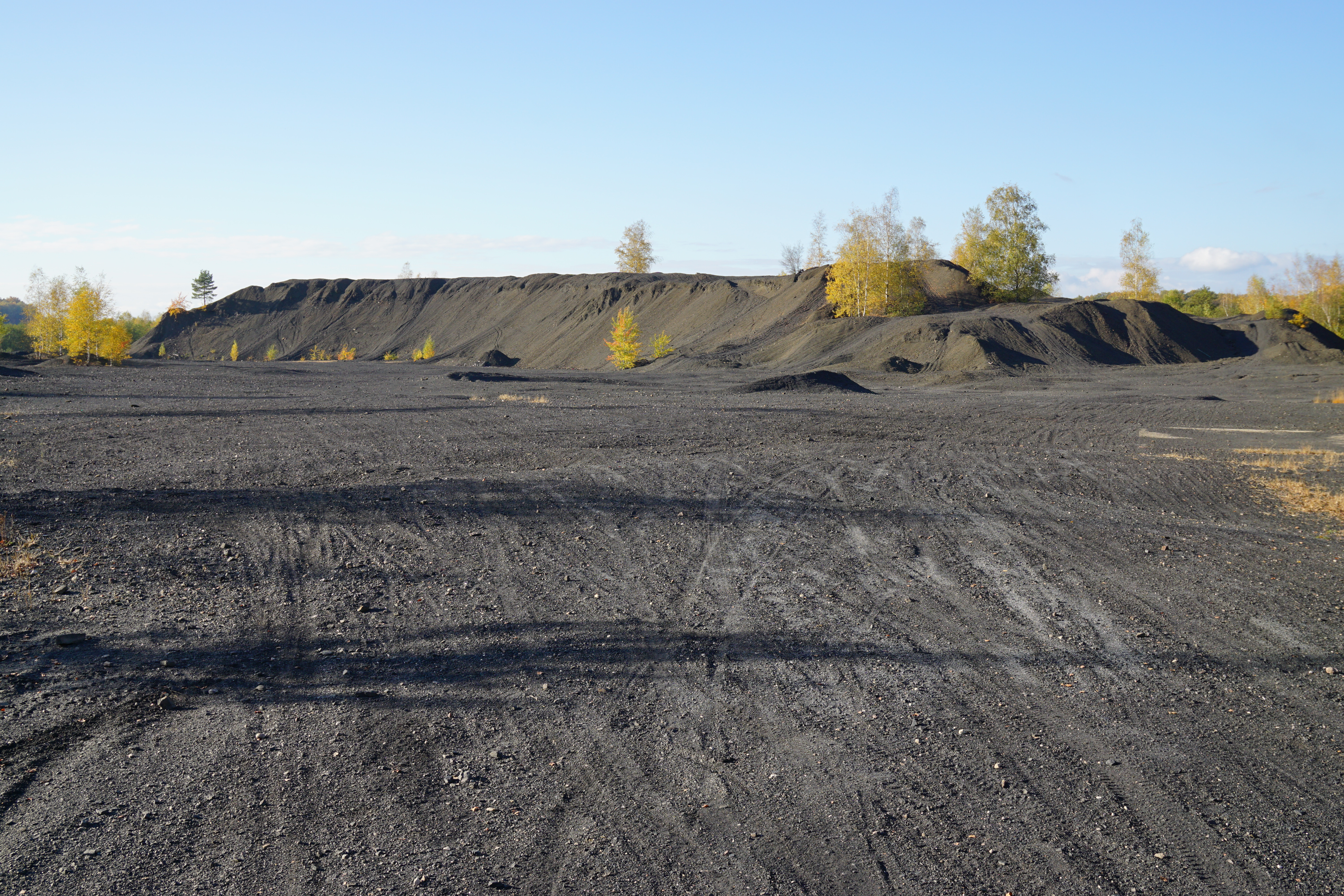
A worked slag heap at Magny-Danigon.

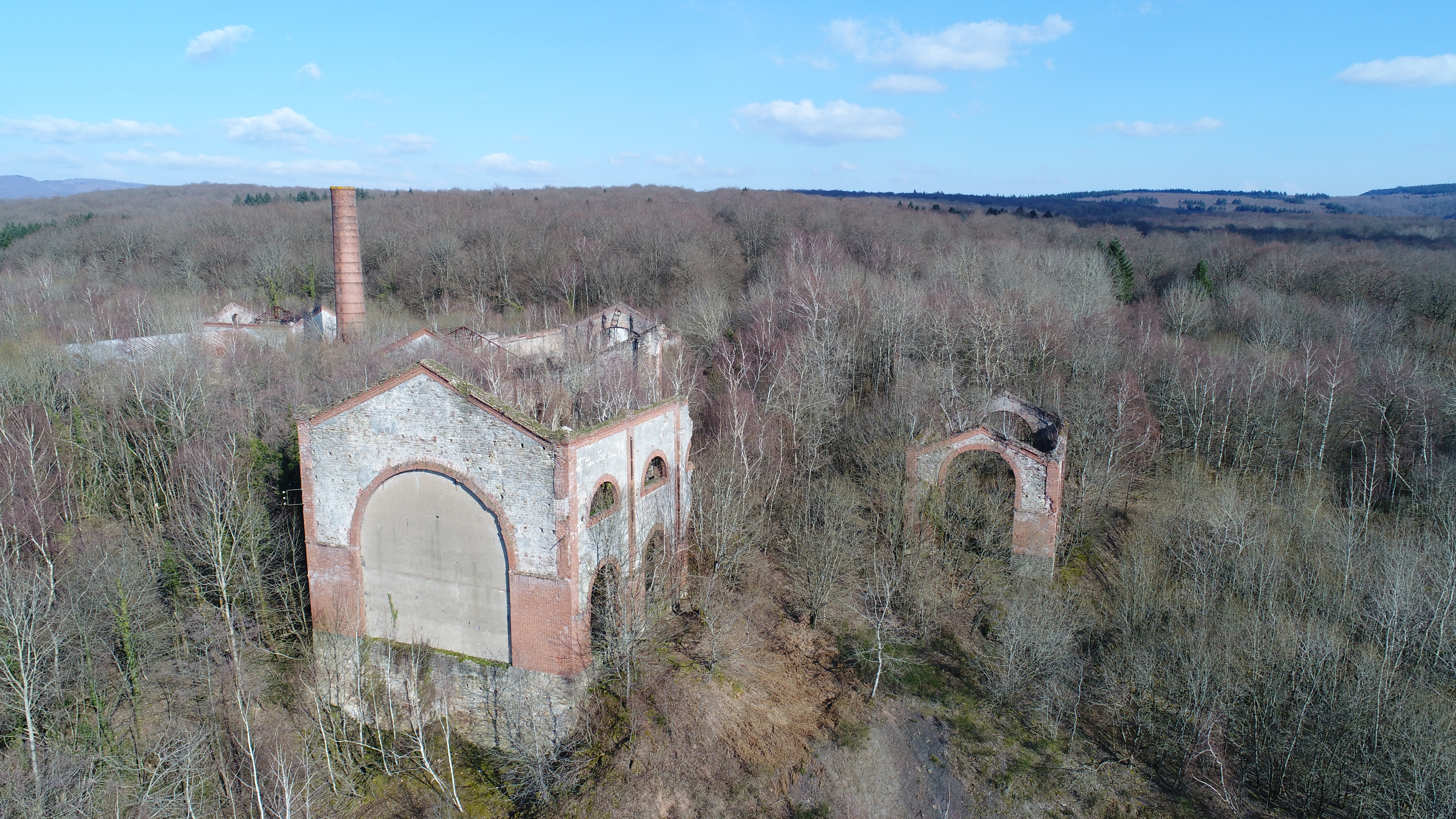
The Arthur-de-Buyer shaft became an industrial wasteland and then a ruin after failed attempts at conversion.

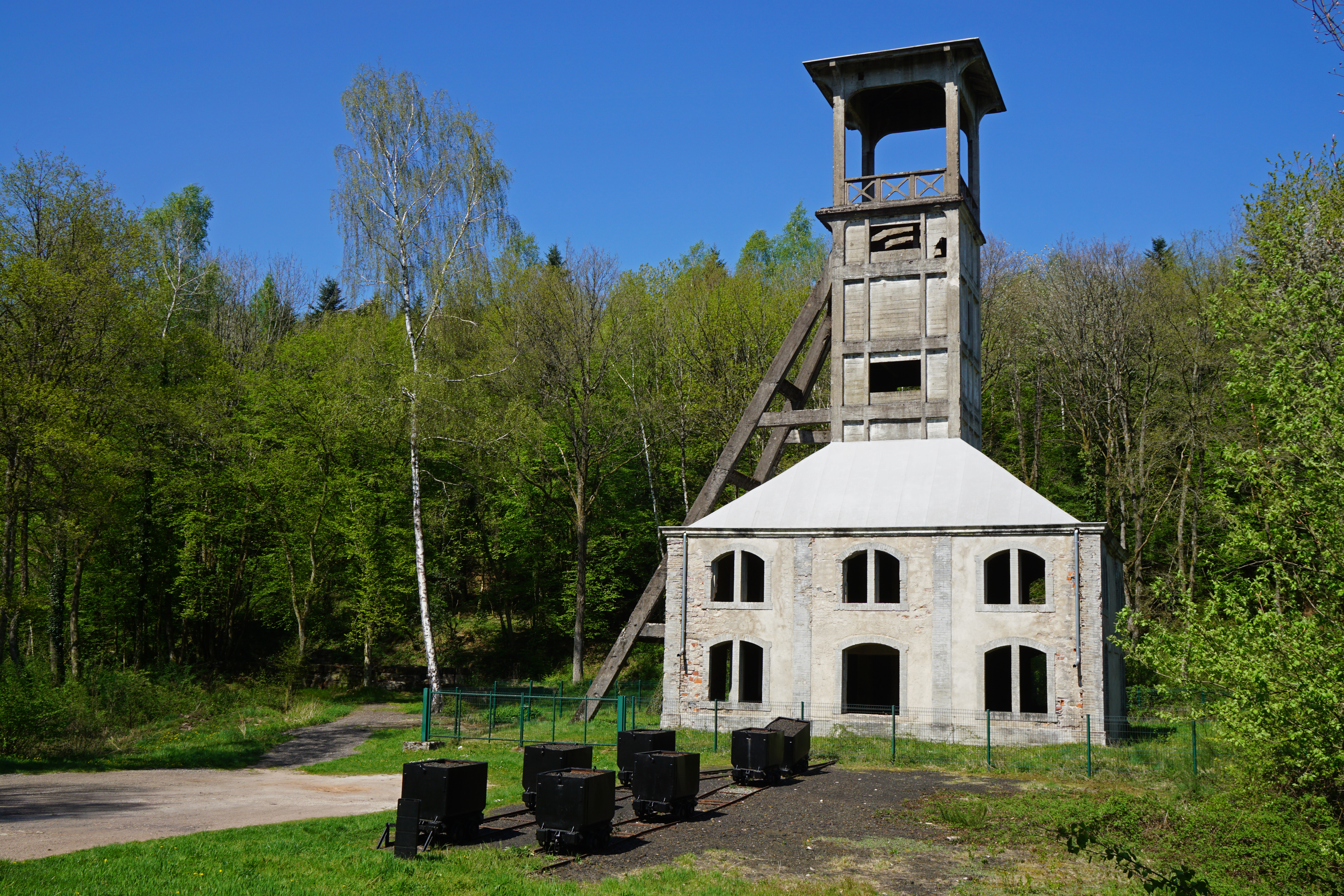
The headframe of the Sainte-Marie shaft.

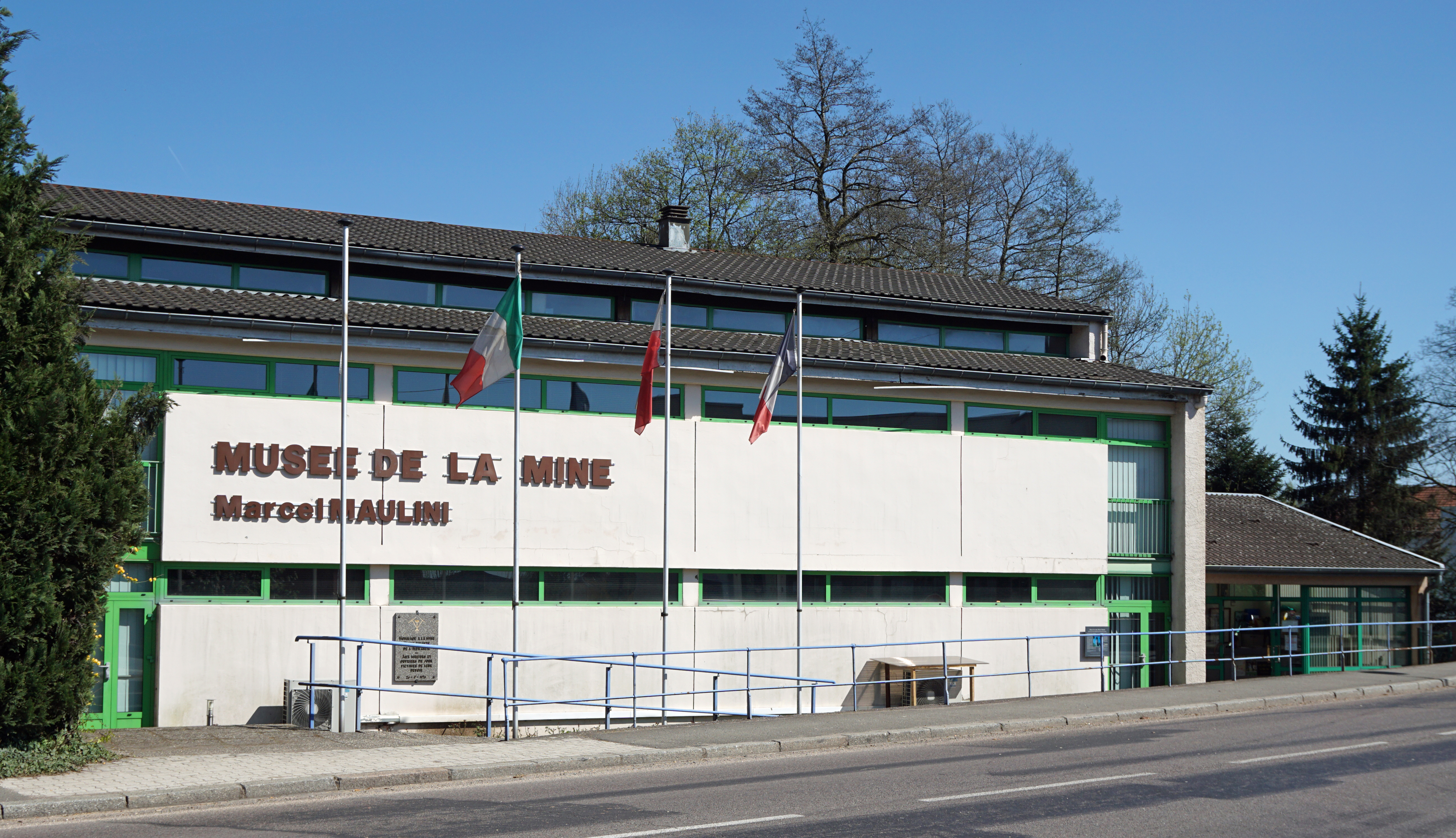
Marcel-Maulini mining museum.

=== Éboulet ===
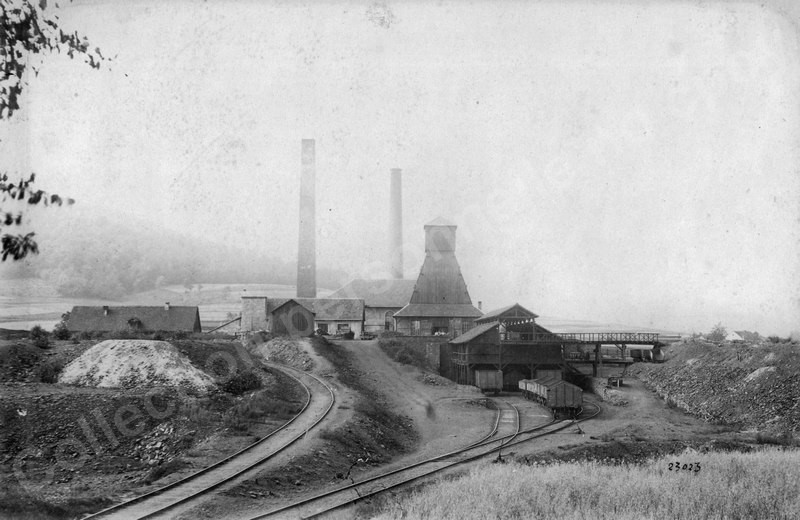
The Notre-Dame shaft, recovered by the Ronchamp coal mines.

In 1847, a competing company to the Ronchamp coal mines was established: the Compagnie des maîtres de forge, which initiated exploration near the hamlet of Éboulet, approximately 100 meters south of the Ronchamp concession boundary. On 18 March 1851, Messrs. Patret, de Pruines, and their associates requested a concession south of the Ronchamp area; however, it was denied due to insufficient exploration results. Competition between the two companies subsequently intensified. In 1856, the Éboulet company undertook further exploration by sinking three shafts. The Notre-Dame d'Éboulet shaft reached a depth of 564 meters and began coal extraction, while the East shaft was abandoned at seven meters, and the West shaft remained shallow, at only two to three meters deep.

The mining operations incurred substantial financial costs, weakening the competing companies, particularly after a third entity, the Société des ingénieurs (also known as the Société du Crédit Mobilier), entered the sector. Initially conducting exploration in Chaux, the company later carried out two additional surveys: one at La Châtelaie, near the Espérance and East shafts, and another near the village of Clairegoutte. A separate group of landowners from the Moselle region also undertook surveys near Errevet. These efforts yielded no significant results. In March 1858, the Société des ingénieurs was the first to cease operations due to the unproductive outcomes of its surveys at Chaux and La Châtelaie. It abandoned the Clairegoutte site and liquidated its assets, which were subsequently acquired by a contractor from Belfort who continued activity for a limited period. In April 1858, the Éboulet company halted work on the Notre-Dame shaft at a depth of 230 meters, opting instead to pursue a more economical survey. The company renewed its concession request on 26 August 1859 with a revised perimeter. The Éboulet concession was officially granted by decree on 4 June 1862, and the company was formally established as the Société civile d'Éboulet on 1 July 1862, with Mr. Thormann appointed as director.

Facing difficulties, the Éboulet Coal Mines were merged with the Ronchamp Coal Mines on 30 May 1866.

=== Mourière ===
47.7167°N 6.6167°E

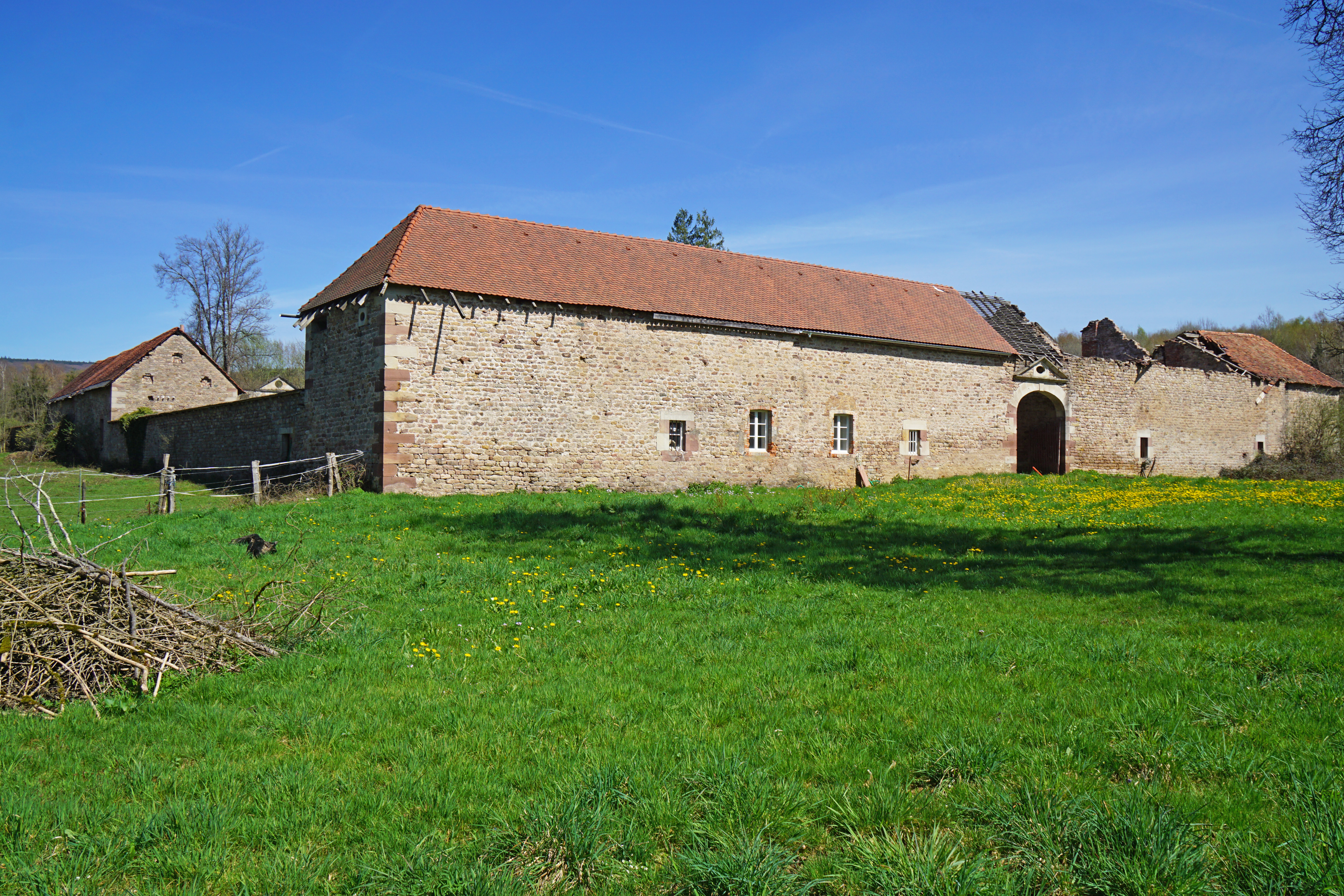
Saulnaire glassworks.

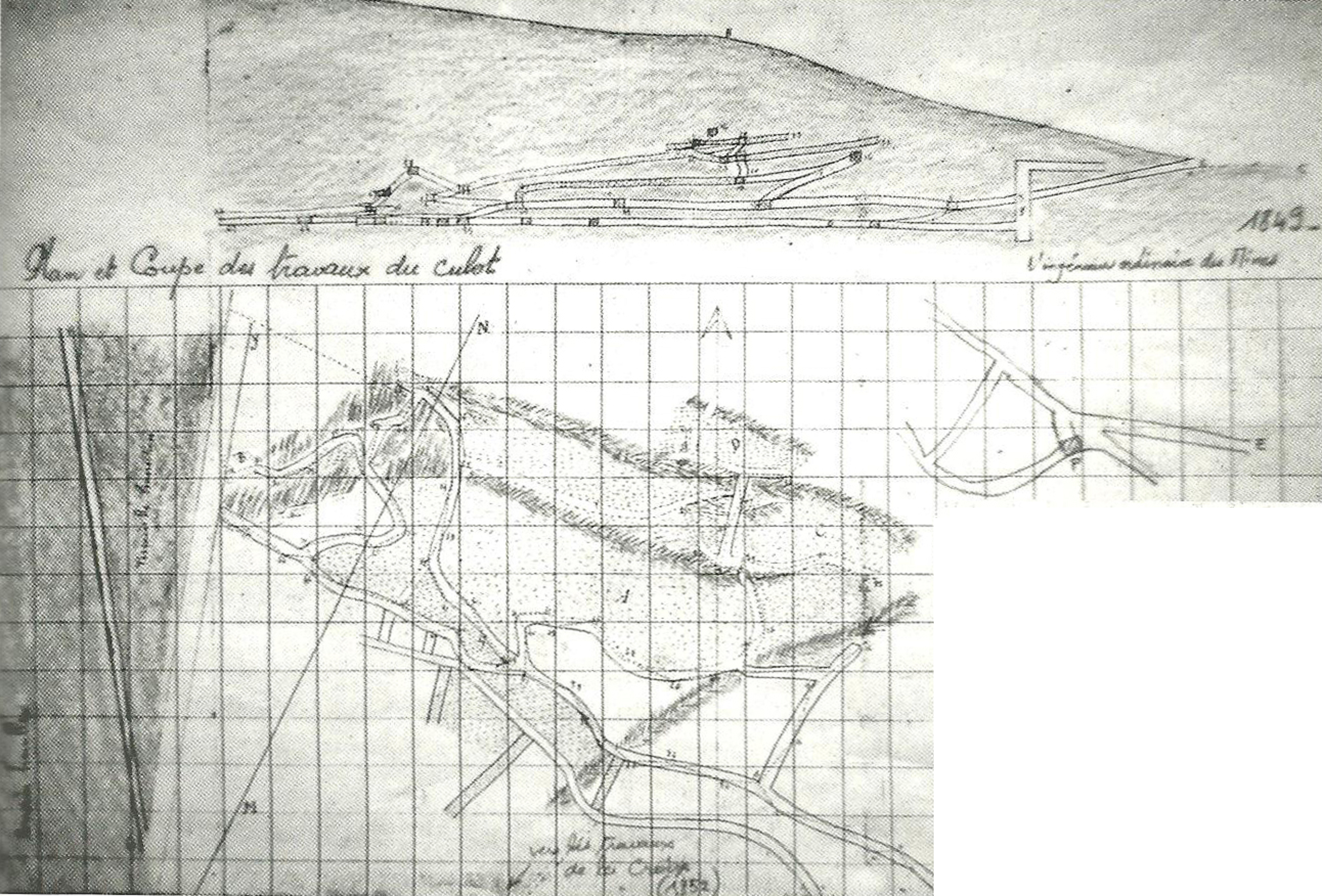
Plan and cross-section of mining operations at Culot in Mourière.

The coal concession of the hamlets of Mourière and Aurière, located northwest of Bourlémont hill on the lands of Faucogney and Ronchamp, was granted to the Prince of Bauffremont on 25 October 1766 but was not exploited. In 1793, Mr. Grésely, owner of the Saulnaire glassworks, sought to acquire the concession to supply his operations with coal. Limited mining activities occurred from the 1790s to the 1840s. By ordinance dated 22 May 1844, the Mourière concession was granted to Mr. Grésely Jr., in partnership with Messrs. Conrad and associates. After several unsuccessful explorations, mining operations commenced approximately one kilometre from the hamlet of Mourière, at a site known as Culot de la Breuchotte, where two galleries were excavated. The coal seams in this area inclined 15 to 20° southwest. In 1849, the Croix shaft was developed despite substantial water ingress, and a connecting gallery was driven toward the Culot site. Mining operations were suspended around 1858 following the accidental death of engineer Barbier.

In 1860, the Mourière concession achieved its peak coal production with 3,000 tons extracted, compared to the combined 160,000 tons produced by the neighboring Ronchamp and Éboulet concessions. Two additional galleries, named "Lower Renaissance" and "Upper Renaissance," were opened during this period. Extraction continued intermittently at these sites until 1872. The concession was acquired by the Société nouvelle des houillères de Mourière, which resumed operations at the old Culot gallery and the Croix shaft, aiming to extract sufficient coal for its needs. In 1872, an exploratory shaft, named Saint-Paul, was sunk but revealed only non-exploitable coal stringers. The following year, the company submitted a request to extend the concession and drilled a survey borehole near the village of Malbouhans to support the application. The results were inconclusive, and the extension request was subsequently withdrawn.

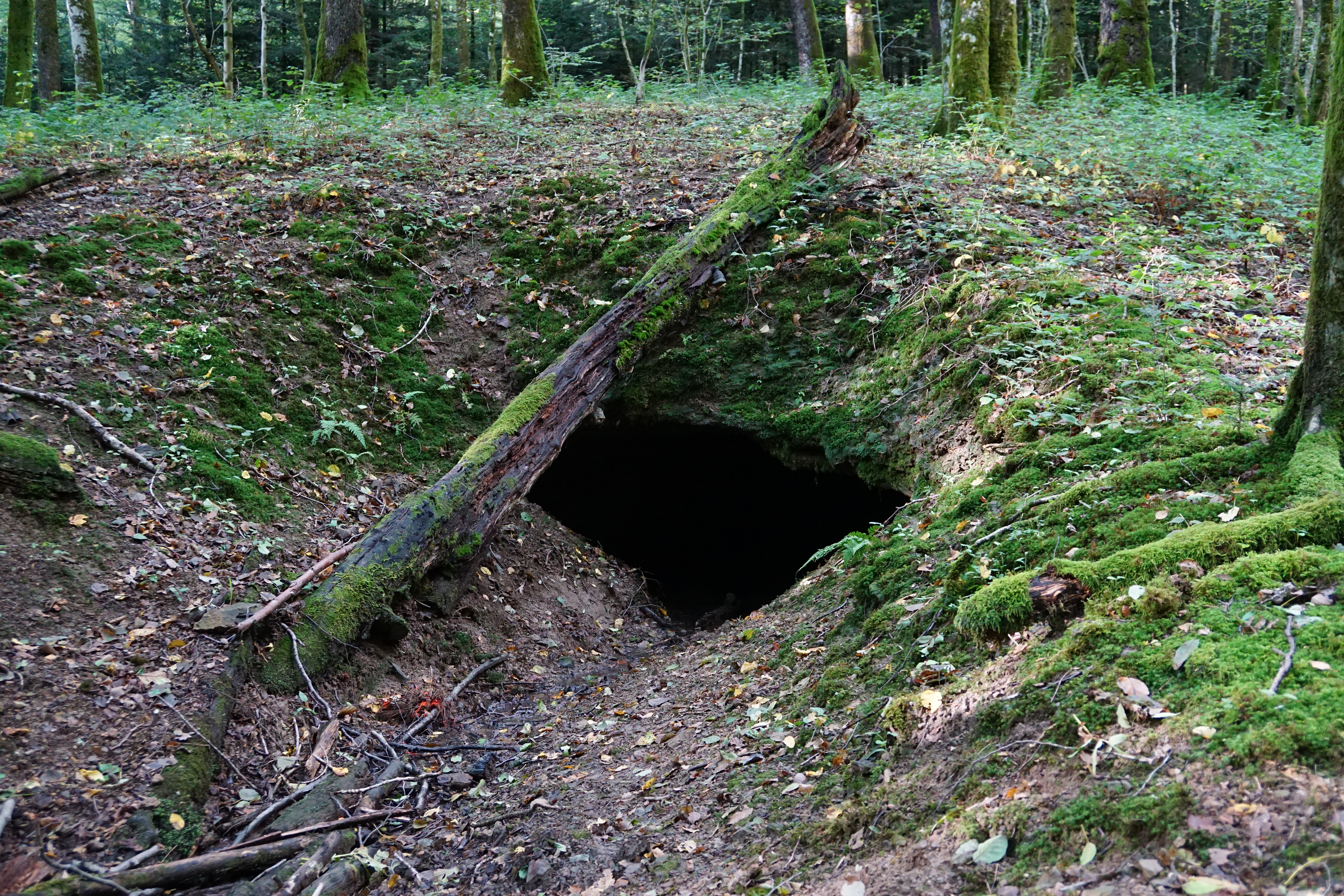
The entrance to the Saint-Louis gallery.

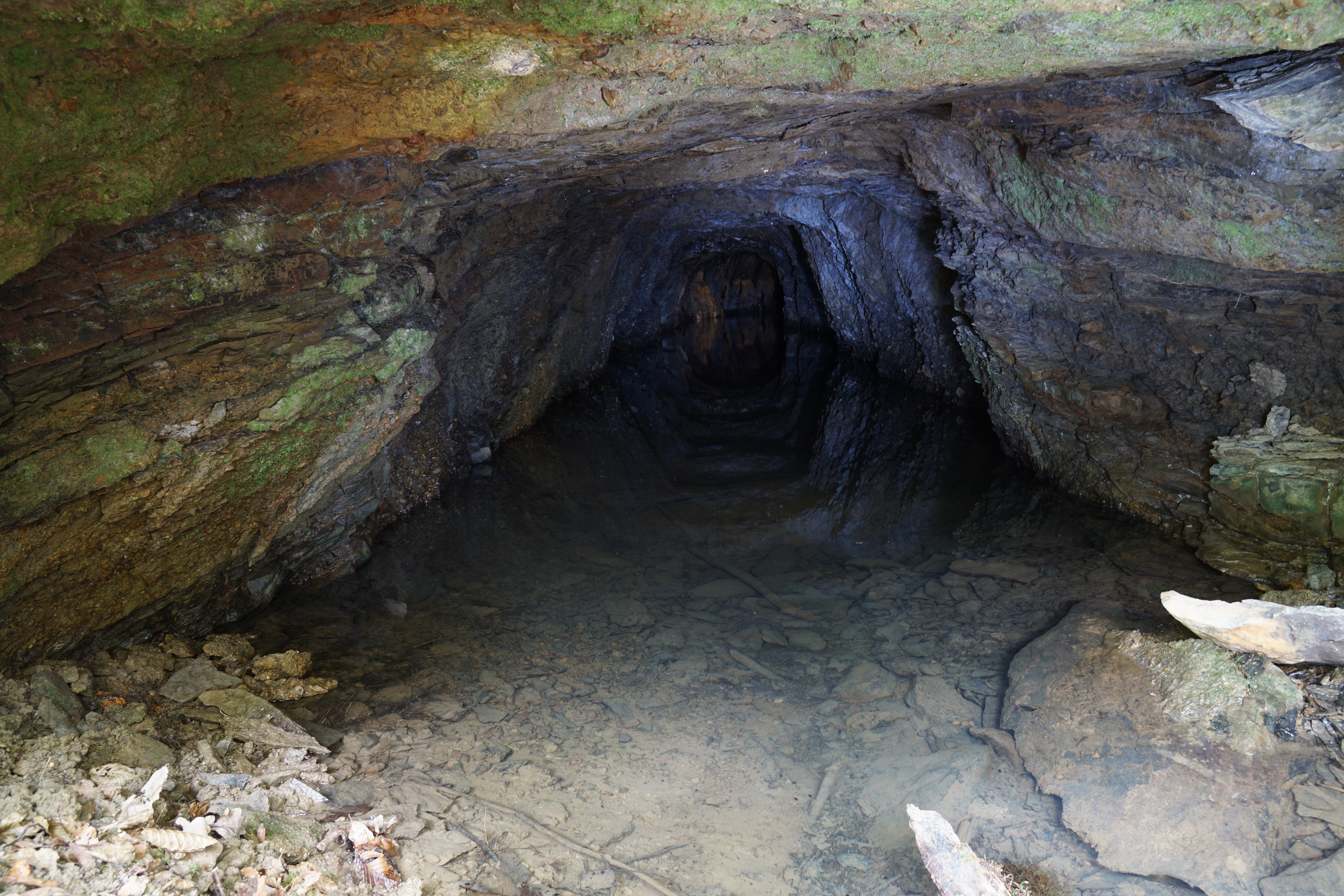
The Saint-Louis gallery was dug around 1870 to drain the Puits-de-la-Croix well.

By 1879, the Culot shaft and associated galleries were no longer in operation. Mining activity continued exclusively in the Renaissance galleries, which yielded approximately 150 tons of coal per month after washing, compared to 100 tons in 1878. Production at the Croix shaft declined from 1,001 tons in 1879 to 588 tons in 1880. In 1881, a new shaft was excavated in the hamlet of Mourière, but it was abandoned in January 1882 after encountering a non-viable 25 cm coal seam at a depth of 55 meters. The operating company was liquidated in 1891, marking the end of all mining activity within the Mourière concession. No further attempts at exploitation were made thereafter.

In 1958, the map published by the Institut Géographique National (IGN) identified the Saint-Louis gallery and the Saint-Paul, North, South, Croix, Loup, and Culot shafts. The Culot shaft lent its name to a nearby forestry track. In the early 21st century, remnants of former mining activity, including slag heaps, collapsed shafts, and gallery entrances, were still visible.

List of operational mine shafts
Sinking	Name	Depth	Activity	Function
1849	Croix shaft	98 m	1851 – 1891	extraction
?	Wolf shaft	? m	? – ?	extraction
?	Culot shaft	? m	? – 1879	extraction
1873	Saint-Paul shaft	250 m	1874 – 1882	exploration
1881	Mourière shaft	55 m	1881 – 1882	exploration

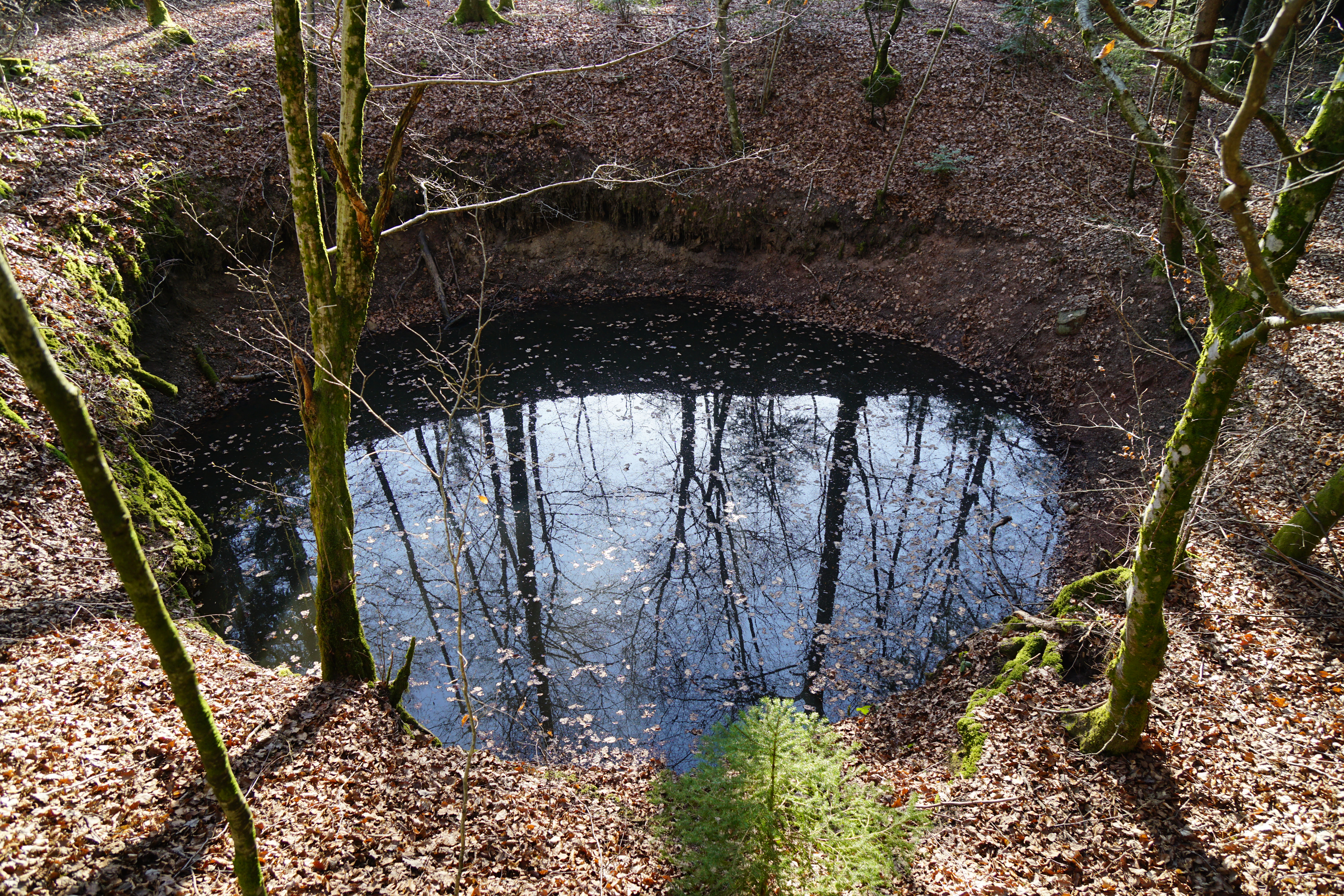
Funnel-shaped hole, flooded, remains of the Croix well.

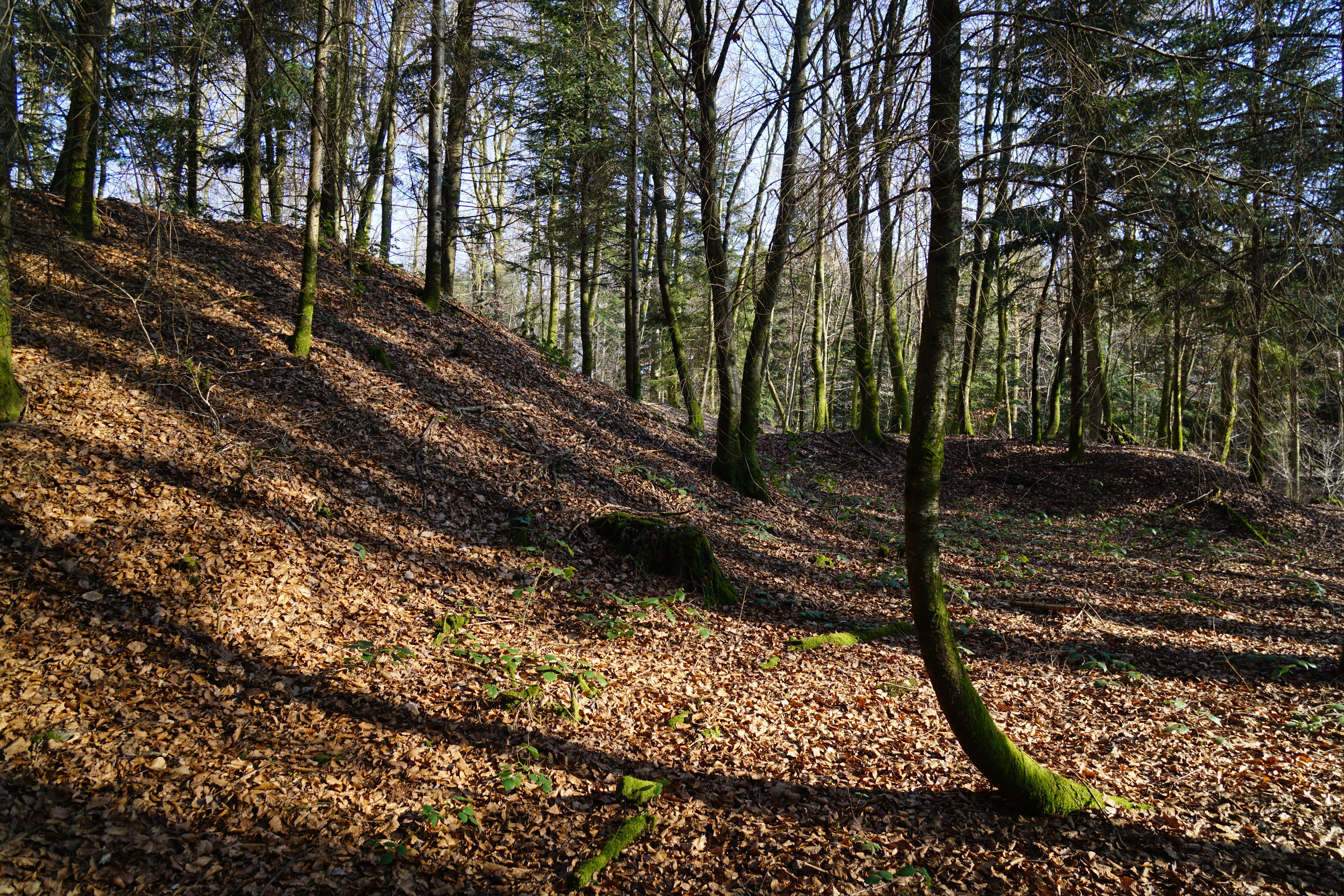
Slag heap.

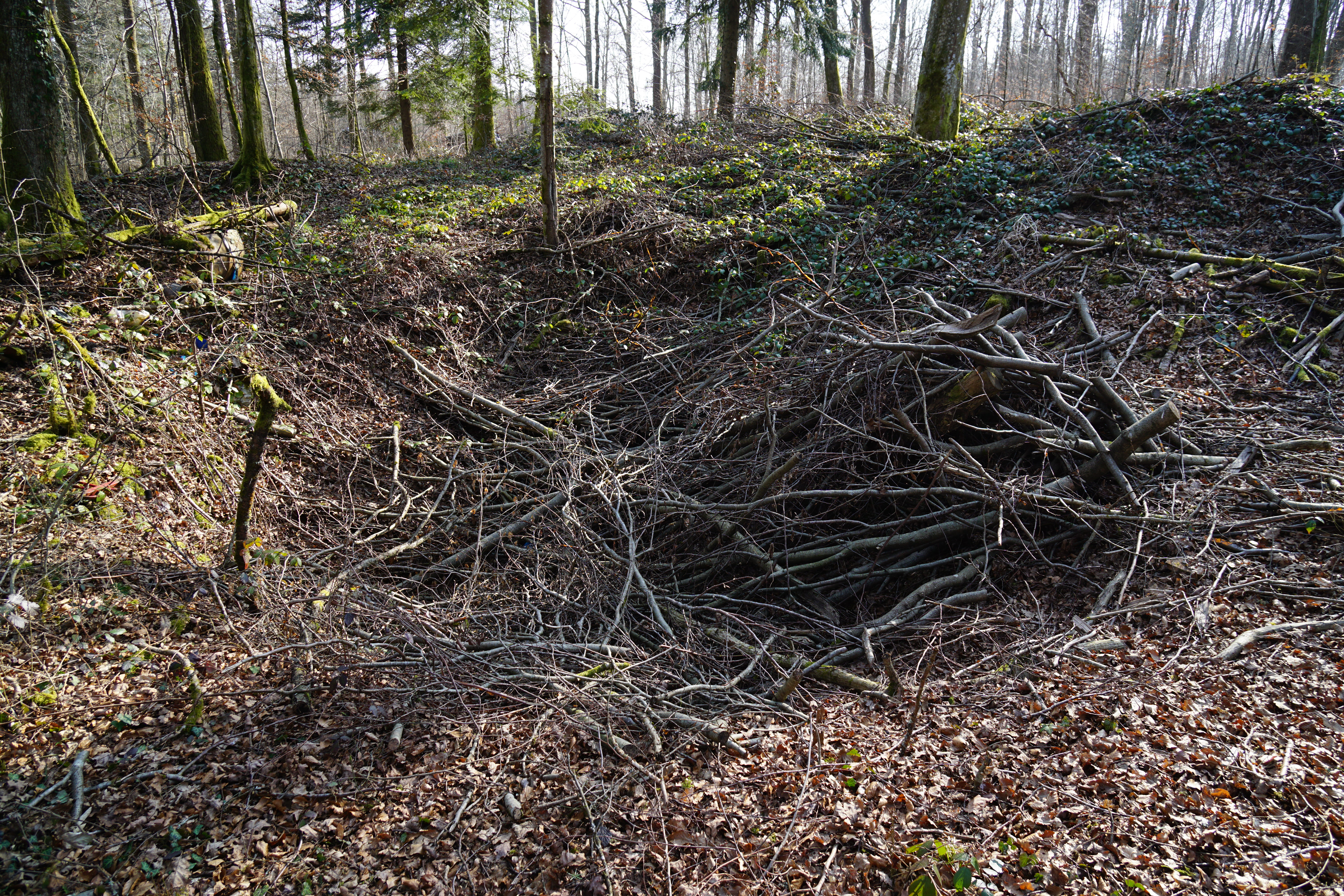
Saint-Paul well.

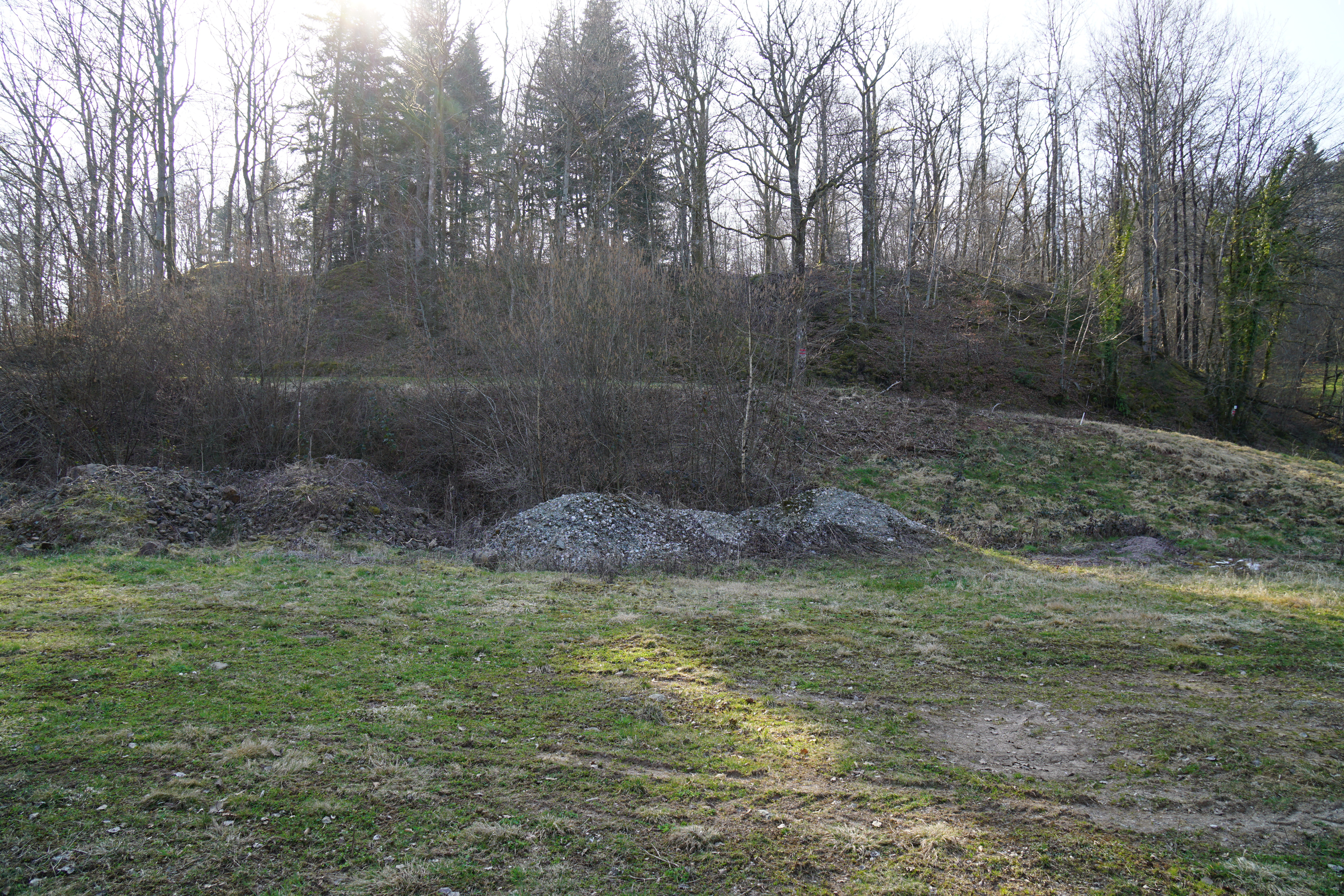
Slag heap.

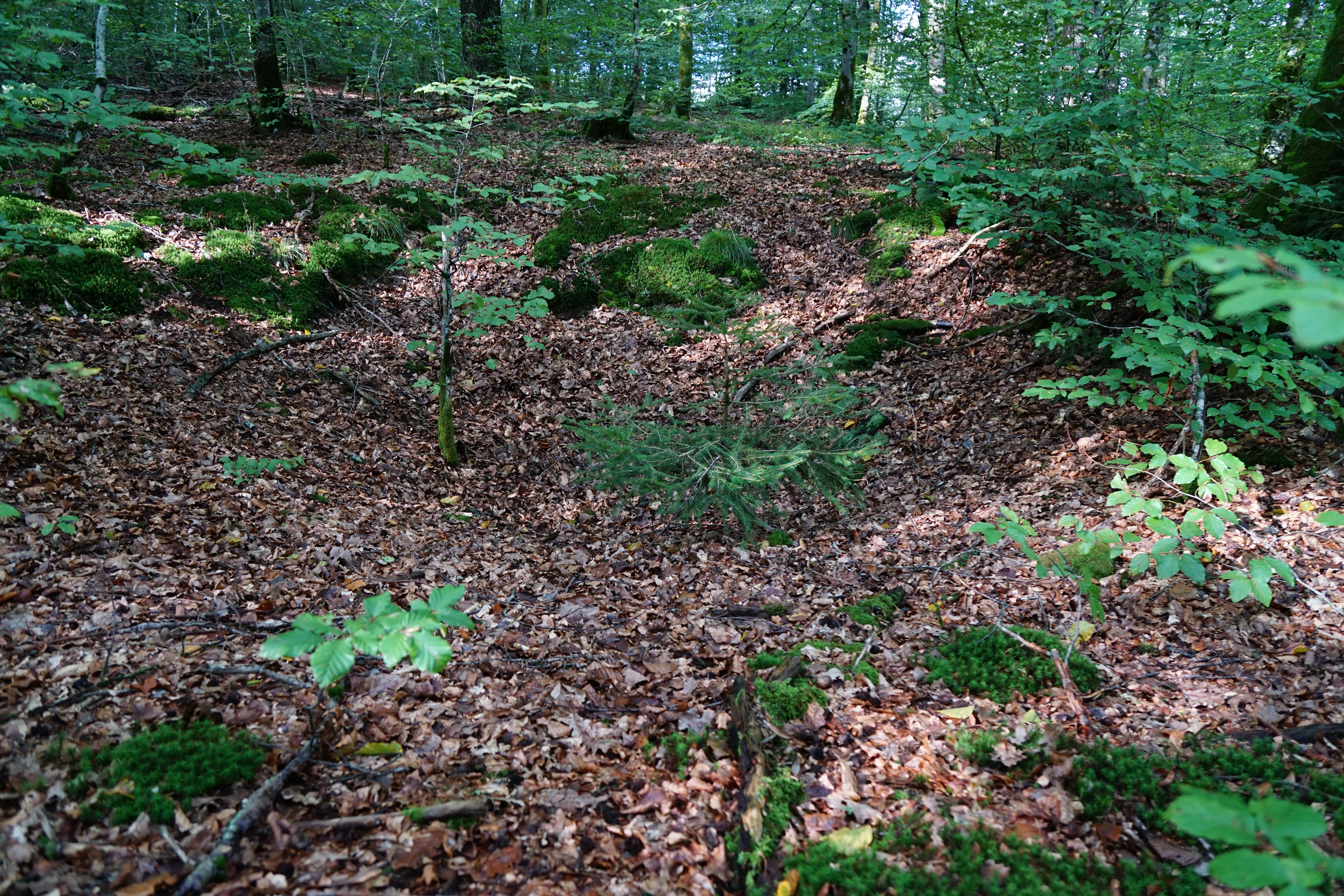
Loup well.

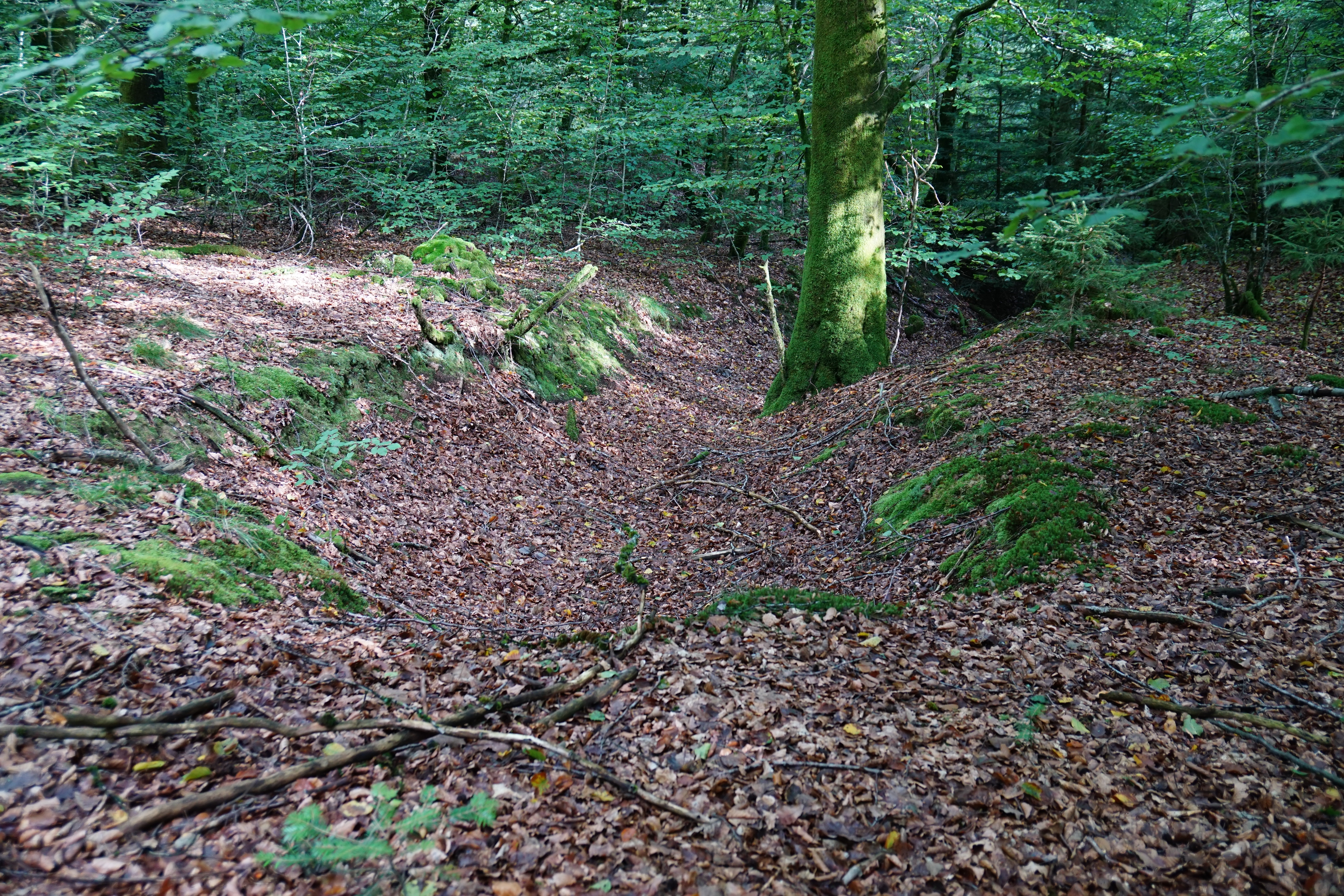
A trench near the Loup well.

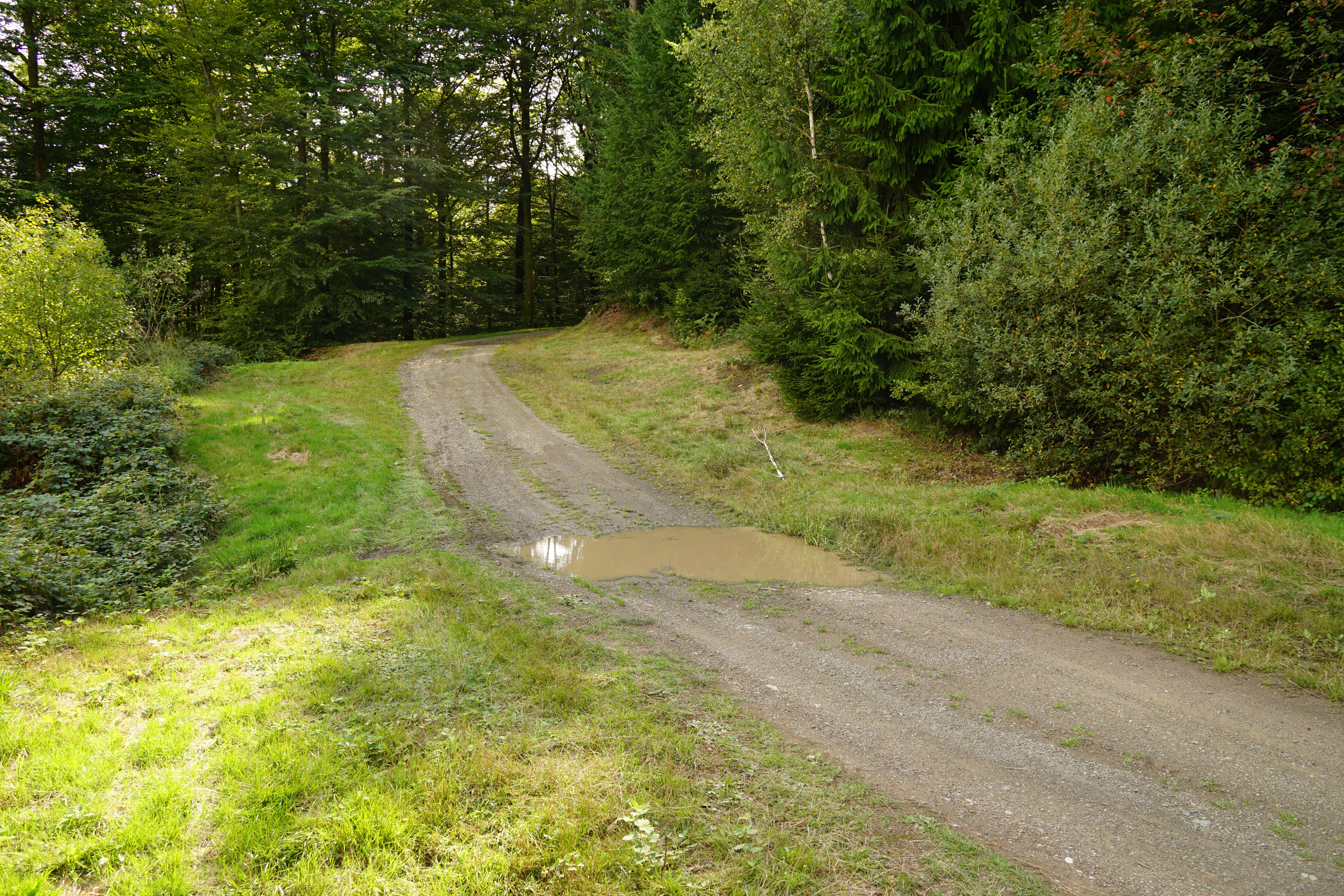
The site of the Culot well.

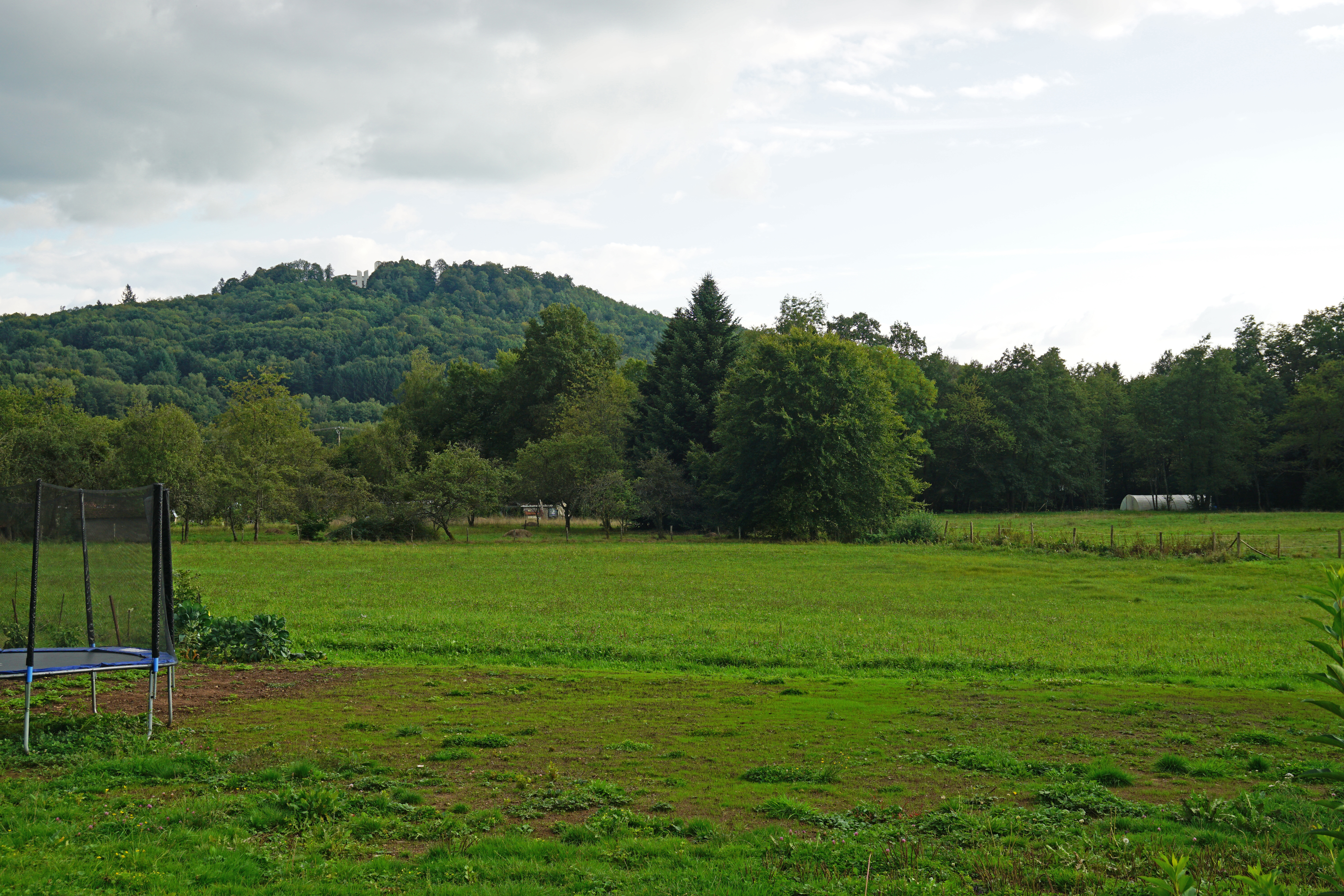
The south well is located behind the curtain of trees, the north well in the garden.

=== Lomont ===
47.6167°N 6.6667°E

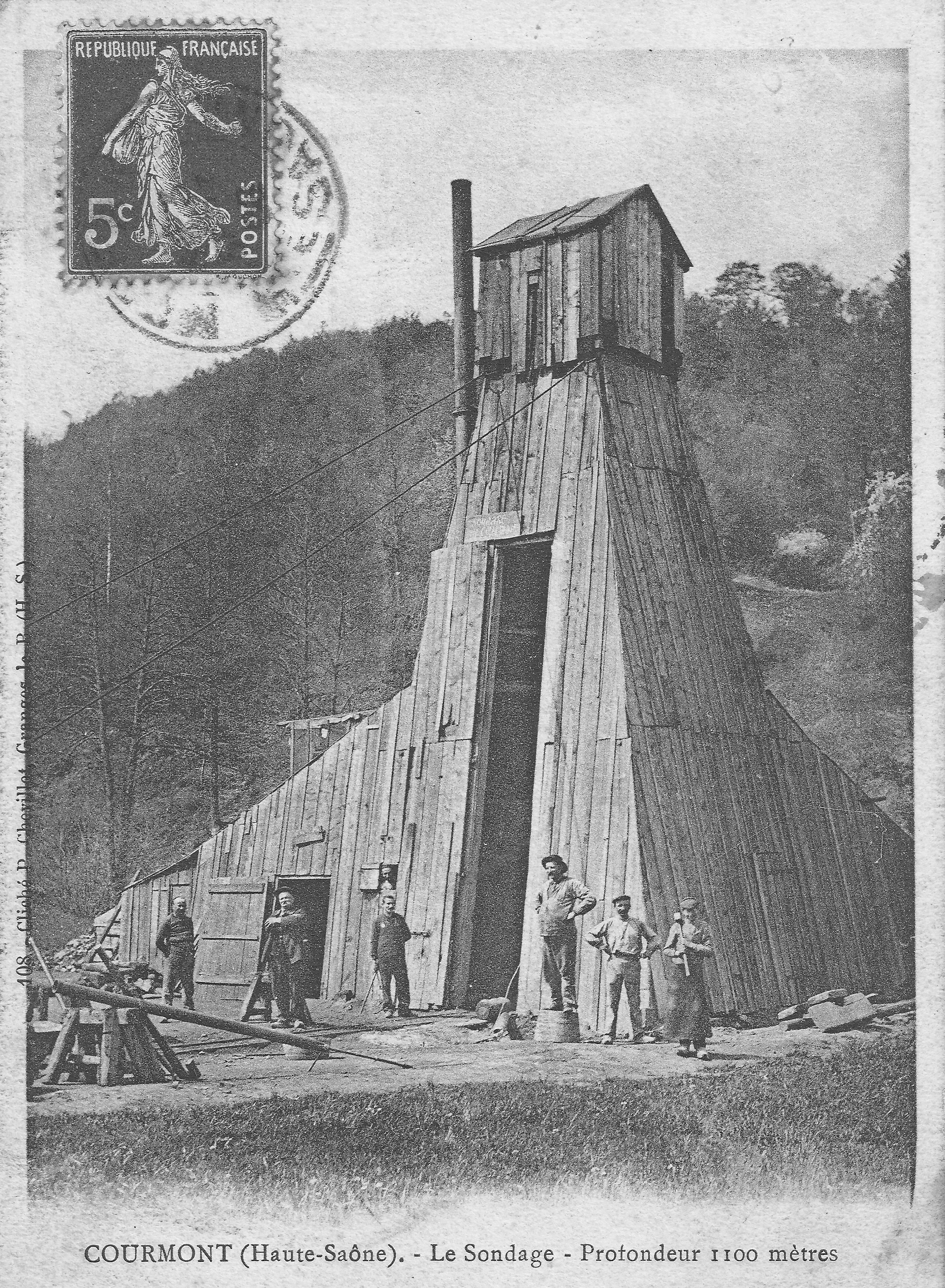
Courmont survey (1,068 m).

On August 30, 1899, Auguste Schwander proposed to Armand Peugeot the exploration of the southern extension of the Ronchamp coal basin. This initiative led to the founding of the Société de recherche de houille entre Montbéliard et Villersexel on September 14, 1903. Among the shareholders was industrialist Jules Japy, director of the Japy firm in Beaucourt.

Several surveys were conducted within the Lomont concession:

- Moulin du Faux survey, abandoned at 498 meters due to an incident on May 23, 1901;
- Pissotte survey, drilled in 1907, yielded negative results at 1,072 meters;
- Belverne survey, begun in 1907 and completed on September 1, 1908, yielded negative results at 899 meters;
- Lomont survey, started in 1902 six kilometers south of the Arthur-de-Buyer shaft, intersected four coal seams with respective thicknesses of 1.25 meters, 1.65 meters, 1.85 meters, and 1.80 meters between 1,090 and 1,106 meters. The total coal thickness reached 6.55 meters;
- The Courmont survey, yielded negative results at 1,068 meters.

Cross-section of the deposit between Ronchamp and Courmont, with the Arthur-de-Buyer coal mine (Magny-Danigon).: Bituminous coal / Fault

The discovery of a substantial coal seam, approximately ten meters thick and located between depths of 1,089.71 and 1,100 meters, confirmed the southern extension of the Ronchamp coal basin. The Lomont concession, covering 2,336 hectares and encompassing the communes of Belverne, Lomont, Courmont, Faymont, Étobon, Clairegoutte, Frédéric-Fontaine, Magny-Jobert, Lyoffans, and Saulnot, was granted on 26 July 1904 to the Société de recherche de houille entre Montbéliard et Villersexel. Despite the concession, no mining operations were undertaken, as the Ronchamp coal mines declined to provide the necessary technical support. In May 1954, the Committee for the Defense of the Ronchamp Mine and Thermal Power Plant proposed the exploitation of the Jurassic coal basin and other concessions in the Haute-Saône department, including Lomont, to create the "Charbonnages de Franche-Comté." The proposal was ultimately unsuccessful.

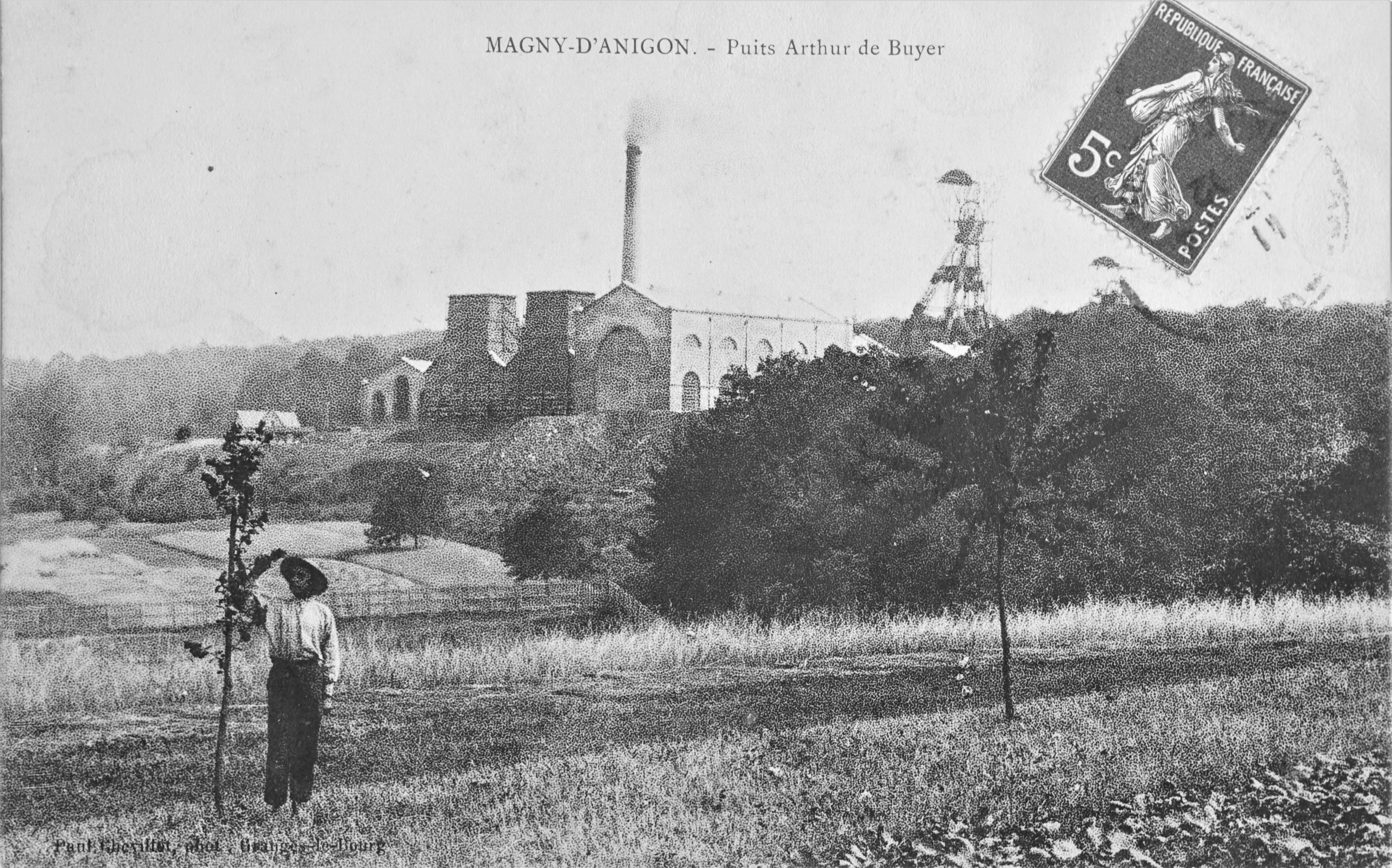
Arthur-de-Buyer shaft (1,010 m), near the Lomont concession.

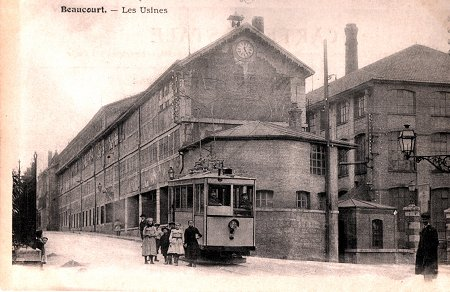
Japy factory in Les Fonteneilles at the end of the 19th century.

=== Saint-Germain ===
47.7333°N 6.5667°E

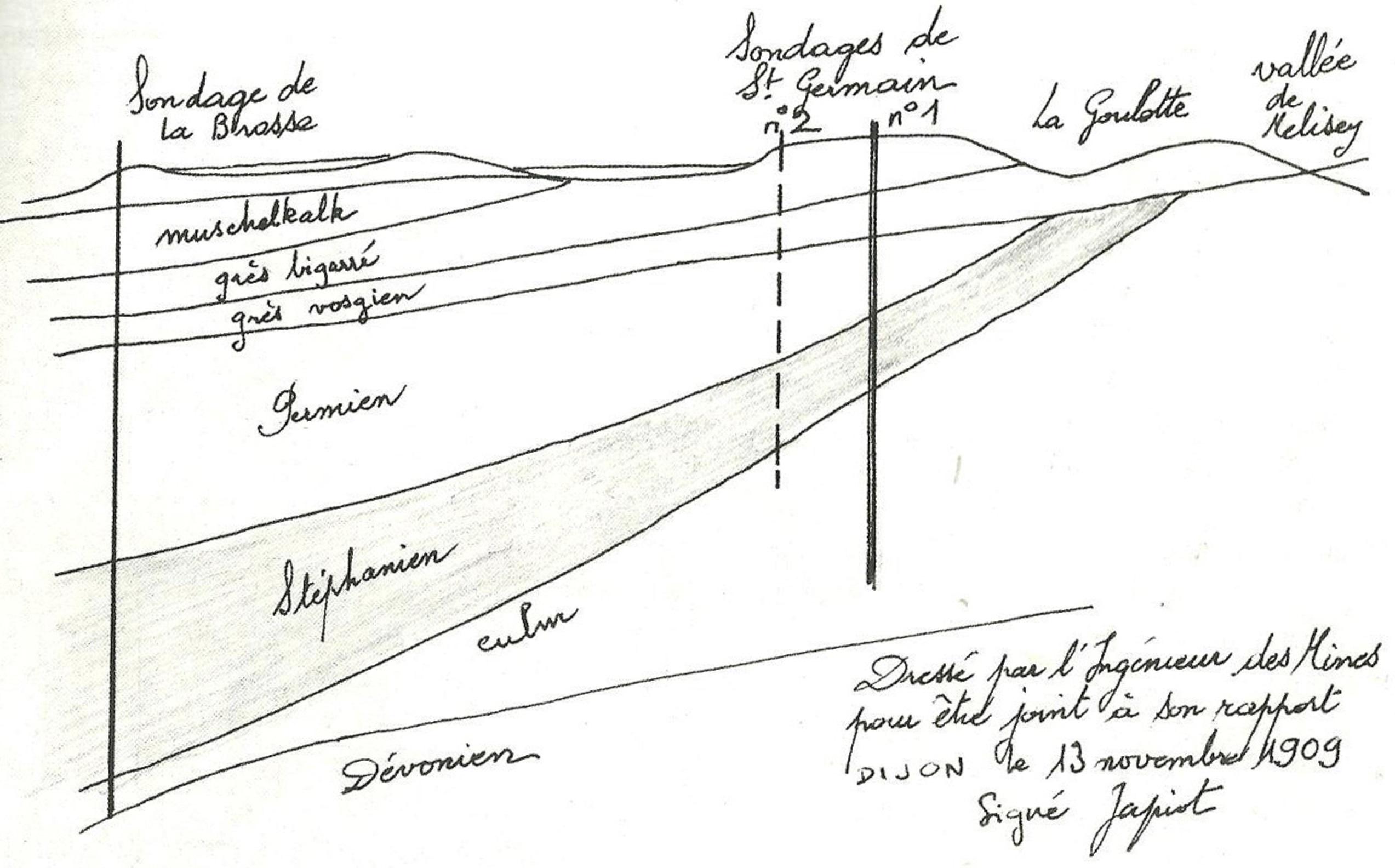
Cross-section of the Saint-Germain basin.

Map of the Saint-Germain concession and location of numbered boreholes.: Positive surveys / Limits of the concession; Negative surveys / Railways

The Saint-Germain deposit, located near La Goulotte south of Mélisey, was identified in the early 20th century and initially considered promising due to the presence of thick coal seams, with the middle Stephanian reaching several hundred meters in depth.

In 1905, a preliminary drilling operation was conducted at La Gabiotte in the commune of Fougerolles, approximately five kilometers northwest of Luxeuil, by a private industrialist. In 1906, a group of associates established the Société civile de recherche de houille de Luxeuil to pursue further exploration. Following favorable survey results, the organization was restructured in 1911 as the Société anonyme des houillères de Saint-Germain. Exploration activities, interrupted by World War I, resumed in 1926 with support from the Société de recherche de houille de Belfort. Despite continued efforts, financial constraints, particularly among shareholders from the declining textile industry, led to the cessation of operations, as noted by Mr. Seyrig.

Surveys conducted near Saint-Germain between 1905 and 1929, approximately ten kilometers northwest of the Ronchamp concession boundaries, confirmed the presence of coal seams:

- Borehole No. 1, La Gabiotte (1905): negative;
- Borehole No. 2, Saint-Germain I (1907): a seam 0.90 meters thick, slightly thinned, at a depth of 240 meters, and coal streaks at 236.70 and 350 meters;
- Borehole No. 3, La Brosse (1908–1909): negative;
- Borehole No. 4, Saint-Germain II (1911): a seam measuring 0.94 meters thick at a depth of 324.65 meters, five seams totaling 1.24 meters between 333.70 and 337.10 meters, followed by a 30 cm seam at 347.75 meters, and finally streaks at 380 meters;
- Borehole No. 5, Grand Morveau, north of Lure (1924–1925): steep dip of the layers, no coal detected;
- Borehole No. 6, Mont or Marcoudant (1926): a 10 cm streak at 530.65 meters, a seam 0.80 meters thick at 600.40 meters, three streaks between 626.55 and 632.20 meters deep, and several streaks at 647 and 656.78 meters; the borehole was accidentally halted at 692.80 meters;
- Borehole No. 7, Froideterre (1927–1928): four seams measuring 0.75; 1.75; 2.50 (thinned by shale); and 1.34 meters thick between 710.05 and 766.25 meters deep;
- Borehole No. 8, La Coulonge (1928–1929): six seams measuring 0.20, 0.35, 0.45, 0.60, 0.58, and 0.35 meters thick between 989.20 and 1,132.60 meters deep.
One of the two Saint-Germain polls.

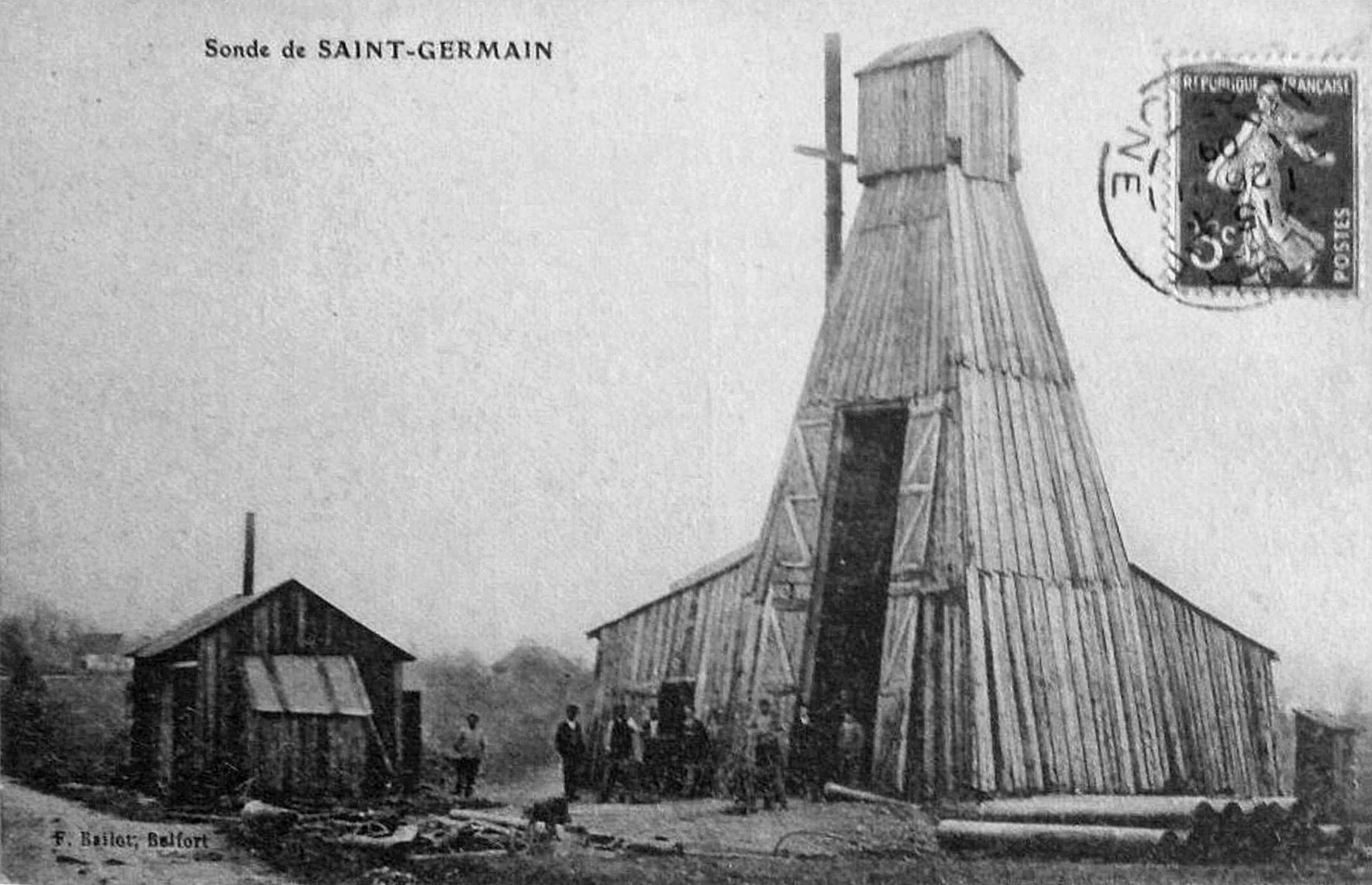

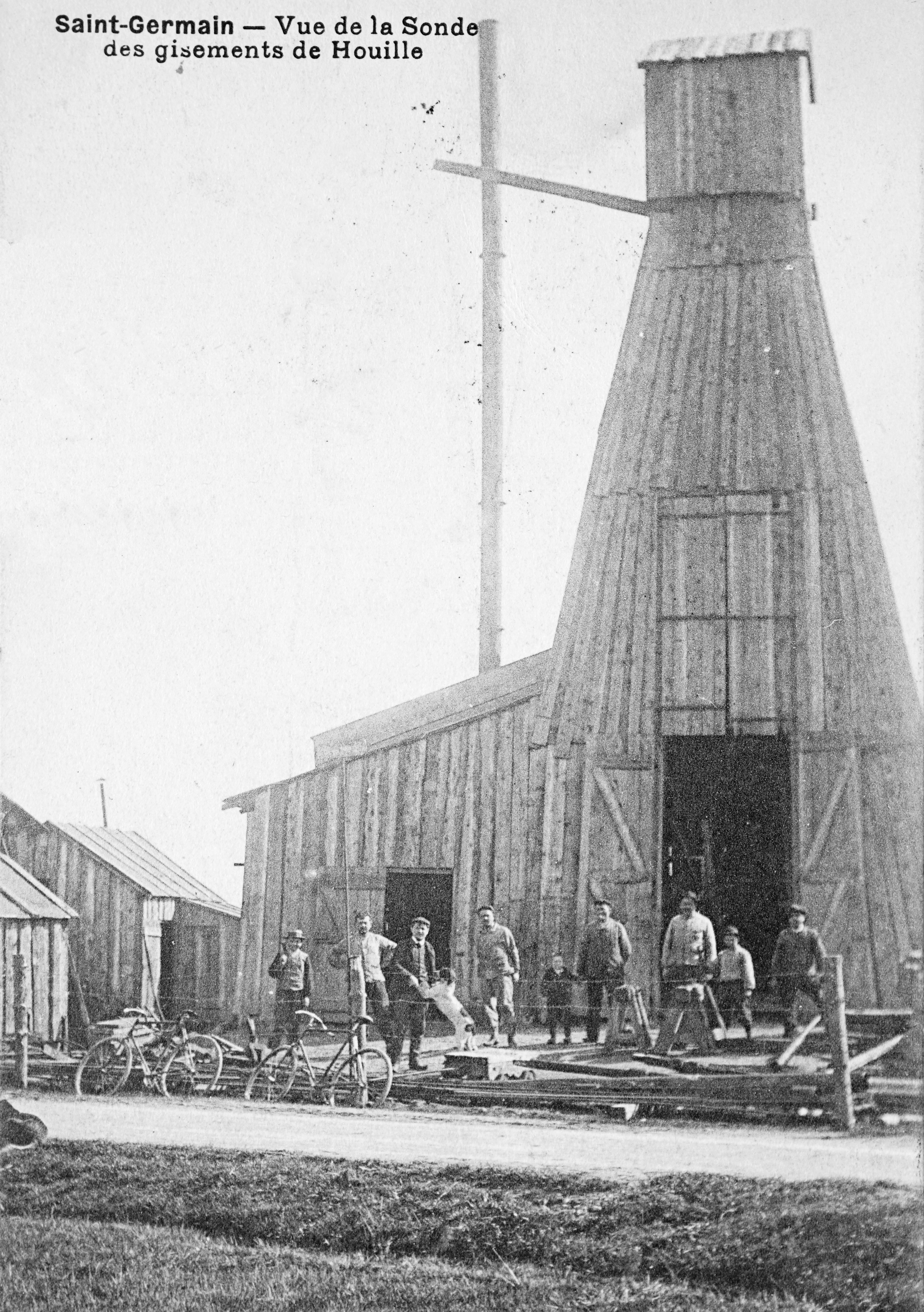

In 1911, Eugène Fournier presented the results of coal surveys to the Academy of Sciences, proposing the development of a major industrial center. A concession covering 5,308 hectares was granted by decree on June 5, 1914. It included the municipalities of Lure, Saint-Germain, Froideterre, Lantenot, La Neuvelle-lès-Lure, Bouhans-lès-Lure, Rignovelle, Linexert, Franchevelle, Quers, and Adelans. The project was postponed due to the outbreak of World War I and was gradually abandoned due to unfavorable economic and political conditions. Exploration resumed in 1924 but did not result in a conclusive assessment of the deposit's viability. A report by Mr. Delfortrie on September 20, 1951, indicated that experts recognized the deposit's existence but emphasized that its exploitation would require establishing a new mining operation. In May 1954, amid the impending closure of coal mines in Ronchamp, the "Defense Committee for the Ronchamp Mine and Thermal Power Plant" proposed the exploitation of the Jurassic coal basin and other concessions in Haute-Saône, including Saint-Germain, to form the "Franche-Comté coal mines." The proposal did not lead to further development. Reserve estimates varied significantly, with Mr. Fournier estimating 150 million tons and Mr. Guillaume estimating 30 million tons.

== Works outside the concessions ==
=== Exploration in Fougerolles ===
Exploration was conducted north of the Saint-Germain concession, in the area around the municipality of Fougerolles. Boreholes were drilled in 1838 and again in 1906 at the localities of Le Champ and La Gabiotte to investigate a potential extension of the Ronchamp coal basin. These surveys yielded only thin fragments of anthracite, which were not exploited.

Gabiotte survey in Fougerolles.

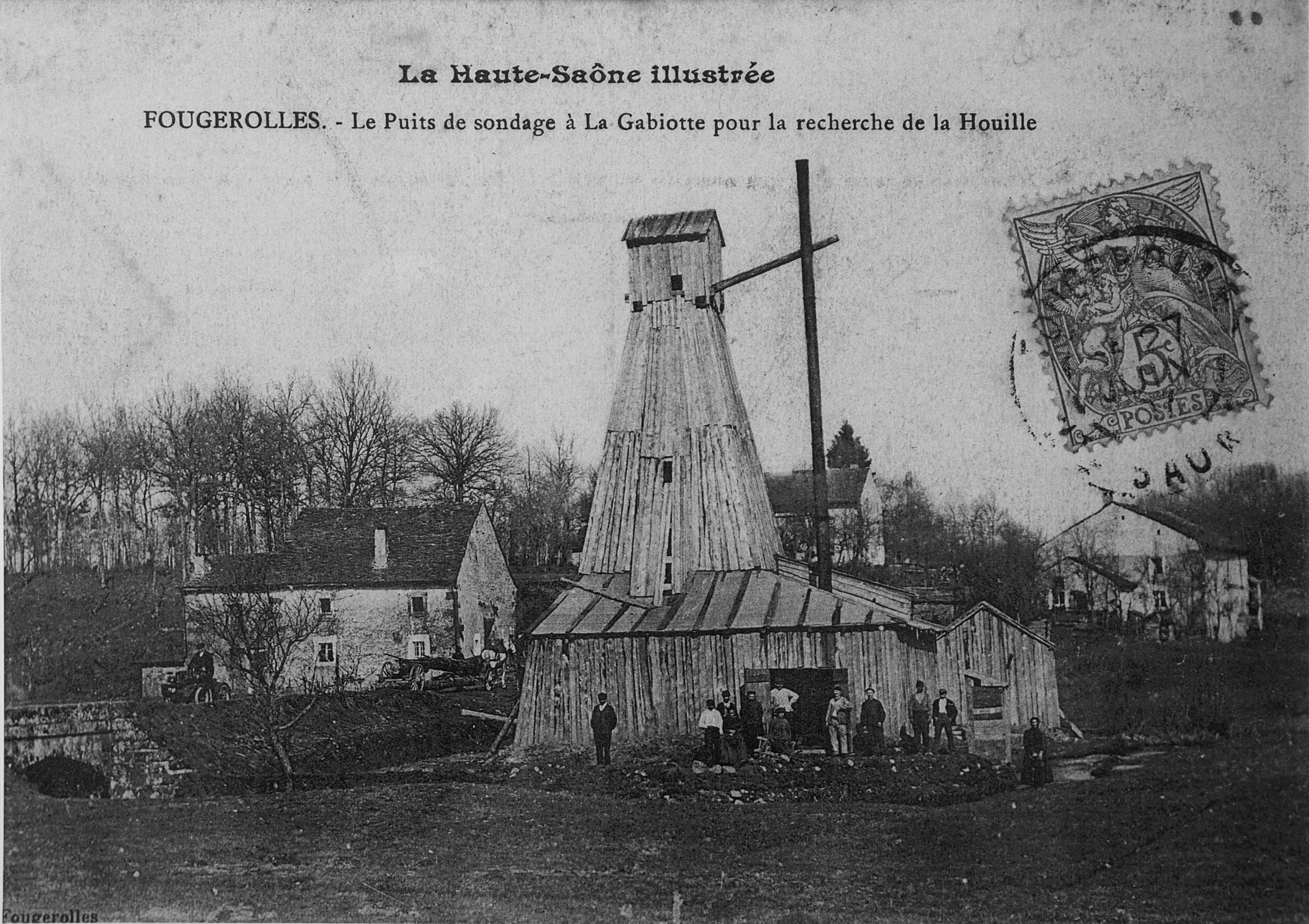

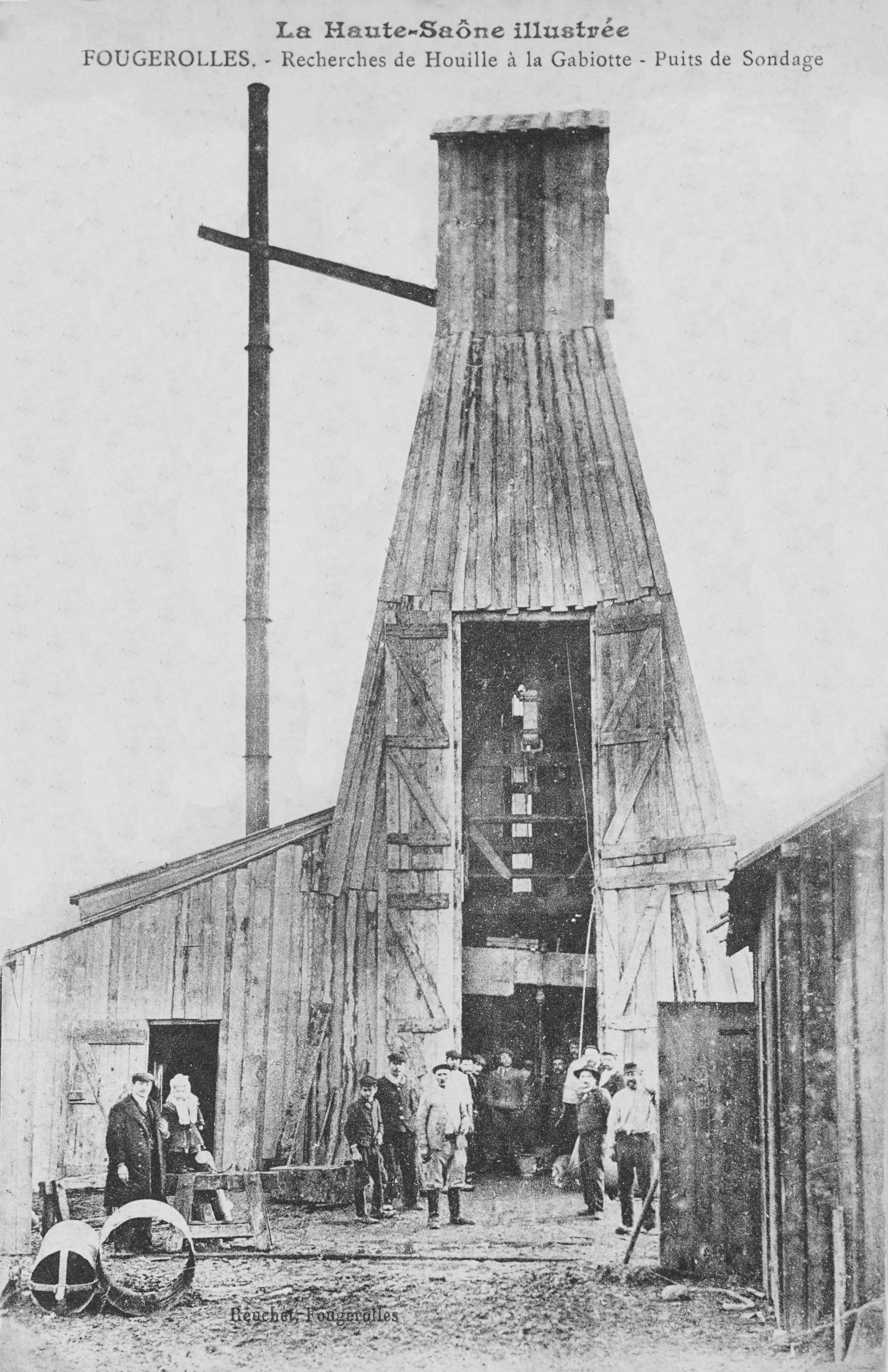

=== Toward the East ===
Throughout the 19th and early 20th centuries, the Ronchamp coal mines and competing companies conducted exploration eastward toward Belfort and Mulhouse. This direction was favored due to the continuation of the Permian basin, overlain by a thick layer of Vosges red sandstone, and the shallower depth of coal-bearing strata compared to the southern area near Lomont. Despite inconclusive results, exploration efforts persisted, although it was recognized that any potential deposits would likely be inferior to those at Ronchamp.

==== Around Thann ====
Around 1809, small quantities of coal were extracted and analyzed in the municipalities of Sentheim, Thann (in the hills of Kaltbach, Steinbilt, and Ricbach), Bitschwiller, and Uffholtz (in the Ertzbach hills). Due to its lower quality and limited quantity compared to Ronchamp coal, it was primarily used locally, particularly in nearby forges and factories.

==== Departmental company of Haut-Rhin ====
Between 1822 and 1832, the Compagnie départementale du Haut-Rhin conducted exploration activities for coal in the southern part of the Haut-Rhin—some of which later became part of the Territoire de Belfort—and in the Vallée de Villé.

==== Coal exploration company of Alsace ====
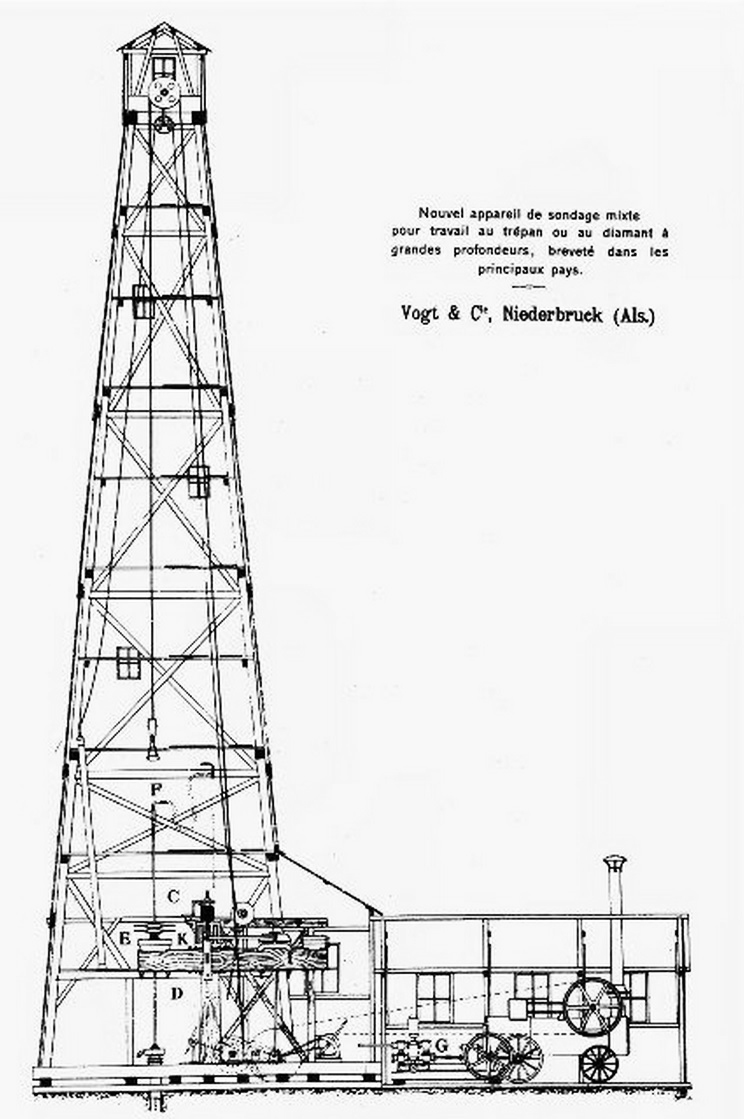
Vogt survey tower.

In 1900, nearly seventy years after the activities of the Compagnie départementale du Haut-Rhin, new prospecting efforts were undertaken in the Doller Valley by Joseph Vogt and Jean-Baptiste Grisez, without conclusive results. In 1904, a mining company was established by Amélie Zurcher, Vogt, Grisez, and other investors to explore the potential extension of the Sub-Vosgian coal basin in the Mulhouse region. This company subsequently discovered the Alsace potash basin. It continued exploration activities until 1910 and initiated the first shaft of the Alsace potash mines.

==== Anjoutey–Roppe ====
47.6833°N 6.9167°E

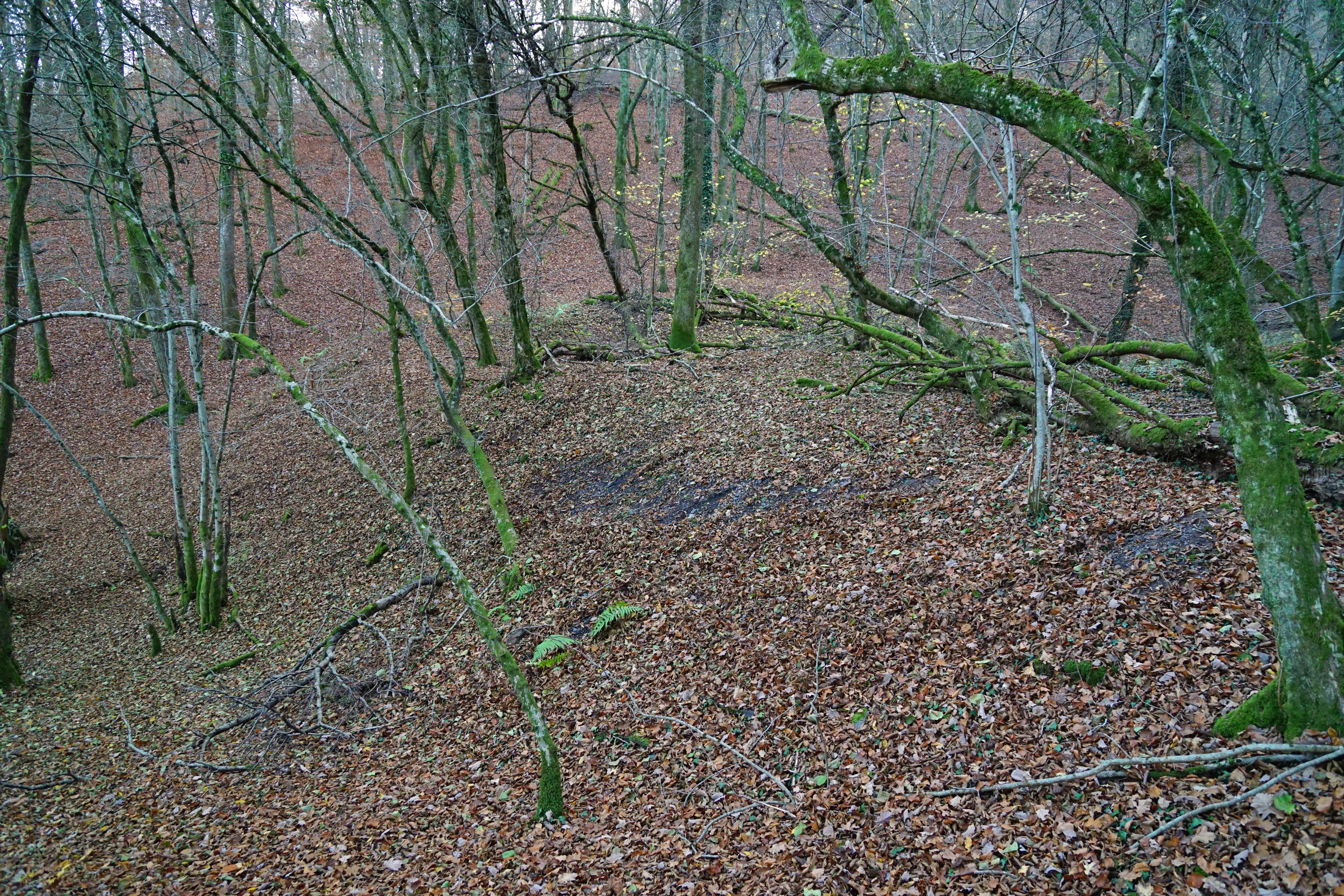
The slag heap of the Roppe mine.

In the Anjoutey area, located north of Belfort, coal-bearing terrain outcrops in two locations: in the fields between Bourg and Anjoutey, and the Arsot Forest, northwest of the Autruche Pond.

Several exploration initiatives were carried out in this region. In 1775, a shaft was dug by an individual named Prevost. In 1843, a coal shale bed was discovered 1.5 meters below the surface by local farmer Angelmann. This shale, containing traces of ferns, was intersected by a 5-meter shaft, which revealed a 20 cm layer of shale with 3 to 4 cm of pure coal. A second shaft, located approximately twenty meters from the first, encountered a seam measuring 10 to 12 cm at a depth of 12 meters. Several cartloads of coal were extracted and used by the Japy company, as the coal, free of pyrite, was suitable for welding iron. Three core samples indicated coal deposits at depths of 10 to 13 meters, with seam thicknesses between 40 and 50 cm. A small company operated the site until the deposit was exhausted. Further drilling campaigns carried out between 1854 and 1856 by Boigeole were unsuccessful.

Between 1860 and 1864, coal exploration was conducted in Roppe by a company founded by Carandal. Thin coal seams were identified in the area. In the Arsot Forest, near the Autruche Pond, a shaft was completed on February 4, 1863, reaching a depth of either 368 or 416.65 meters, without the need for dewatering. Several galleries were also excavated to extract coal lenses measuring 2 to 3 meters in diameter and up to 22 cm thick. However, these operations did not lead to sustained exploitation.

==== Other sites North of Belfort ====
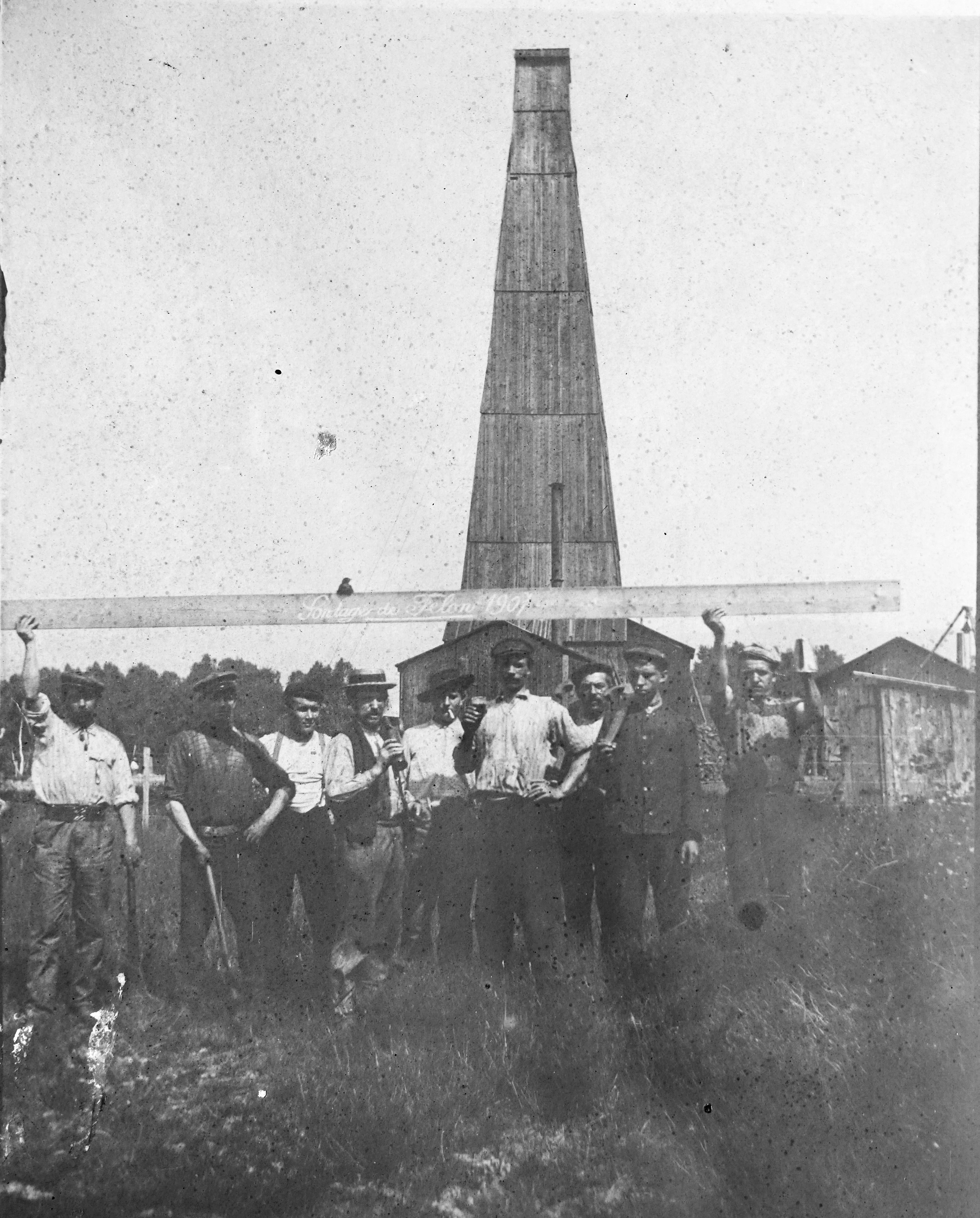
Felon's poll.

At Romagny and Étueffont, a 30-meter-deep shaft was excavated following the identification of coal outcrops. A core drilling was also conducted, but was abandoned at a depth of 434 meters.

At Les Granges-Godey, southeast of Plancher-Bas near Errevet, and at La Cuvotte in Frahier, shallow coal seams were discovered but never exploited.

Several boreholes failed to reach exploitable coal-bearing strata. The Rougegoutte borehole, drilled in 1822 to a depth of 270 meters, did not intersect coal layers. The Chaux borehole (1856) reached a depth of 103 meters, and the Frahier borehole (1870) reached 580 meters, both without success. However, a coal deposit had previously been identified at La Cuvotte in Frahier before 1866.

In 1907, a borehole in Felon reached coal-bearing terrain at 700 meters but the seams were discontinuous and not considered viable for extraction.

== See also ==
- Stephanian (stage)
- Vosges
- Mining basin of Ronchamp and Champagney
- Vosges and Jura coal mining basins

== Bibliography ==
- de Beaumont, Léonce Elie (1828). Observations géologiques sur les différentes formations qui, dans le système des Vosges, séparent la formation houillère de celle du lias [Geological observations on the various formations that, in the Vosges system, separate the coal formation from that of the Lias.] (in French). Mme Huzard.
- SIM (1834). Bulletin [Newsletter] (in French). Vol. 7. Société industrielle de Mulhouse. pp. 205–298.
- Hogard, Henri (1837). Description minéralogique et géologique des régions granitique et arénacée des Vosges [Mineralogical and geological description of the granitic and arenacous regions of the Vosges] (in French).
- Société d'Émulation (1862). Mémoires de la Société d'Émulation de Montbéliard [Memoirs of the Emulation Society of Montbéliard] (in French). Vol. 1.
- Suchaux, L (1866). La Haute-Saône : dictionnaire historique, topographique et statistique des communes du département [Haute-Saône: historical, topographical, and statistical dictionary of the municipalities of the department] (in French).
- Société d'Émulation (1873). Bulletin de la société belfortaine d'émulation [Bulletin of the Belfort Society for Emulation] (in French).
- Trautmann, E (1885). Bassin houiller de Ronchamp [Ronchamp coal basin] (in French).
- Fournier, Eugène (1907). Les Recherches de houille en Franche-Comté, le massif de Saulnot et sa bordure (feuilles de Montbéliard et Lure) [Coal exploration in Franche-Comté, the Saulnot massif and its outskirts (Montbéliard and Lure sheets)] (in French). Société géologique de France.
- Laguerre (1909). Rapports des ingénieurs des mines aux conseils généraux sur la situation des mines et usines en 1908 [Reports by mining engineers to general councils on the situation of mines and factories in 1908] (in French). Comité central des Houillères de France.
- Fournier, Eugène (1920). La houille en Franche-Comté [Coal in Franche-Comté] (in French). Faculté des sciences de Besançon.
- Guillaume, Louis (1943). Rapport géologique sur les recherches de houille dans la région de Saint-Germain (Haute-Saône) [Geological report on coal exploration in the Saint-Germain region (Haute-Saône)] (PDF) (in French). BRGM.
- CDM (1954). Livre jaune pour le maintien en activité de l'exploitation minière et de la centrale thermique de Ronchamp [Yellow paper on keeping the Ronchamp mine and thermal power plant in operation] (PDF) (in French). Committee for the Defense of the Ronchamp Mine and Thermal Power Plant.
- Parietti, Jean-Jacques (1999a). Les dossiers de la Houillère 1 : Le puits Sainte-Marie [The Coal Mine Files 1: The Sainte-Marie Shaft] (in French). Association des amis du musée de la mine.
- Parietti, Jean-Jacques (1999b). Les dossiers de la Houillère 2 : Le puits Arthur de Buyer [The Coal Mine Files 2: The Arthur de Buyer Shaft] (in French). Association des amis du musée de la mine.
- Parietti, Jean-Jacques (1999c). Les dossiers de la Houillère 4 : Le puits d'Éboulet [The Coal Mine Files 4: The Éboulet Shaft] (in French). Association des amis du musée de la mine.
- Parietti, Jean-Jacques (1999d). Les dossiers de la Houillère 5 : Le puits du Magny [The Coal Mine Files 5: The Magny Shaft] (in French). Association des amis du musée de la mine.
- Parietti, Jean-Jacques (2001). Les Houillères de Ronchamp vol. I : La mine [The Coal Mines of Ronchamp, Volume I: The Mine] (in French). Vesoul: Éditions Comtoises. ISBN 2-914425-08-2.
