= Madeleine (river) =

River in France

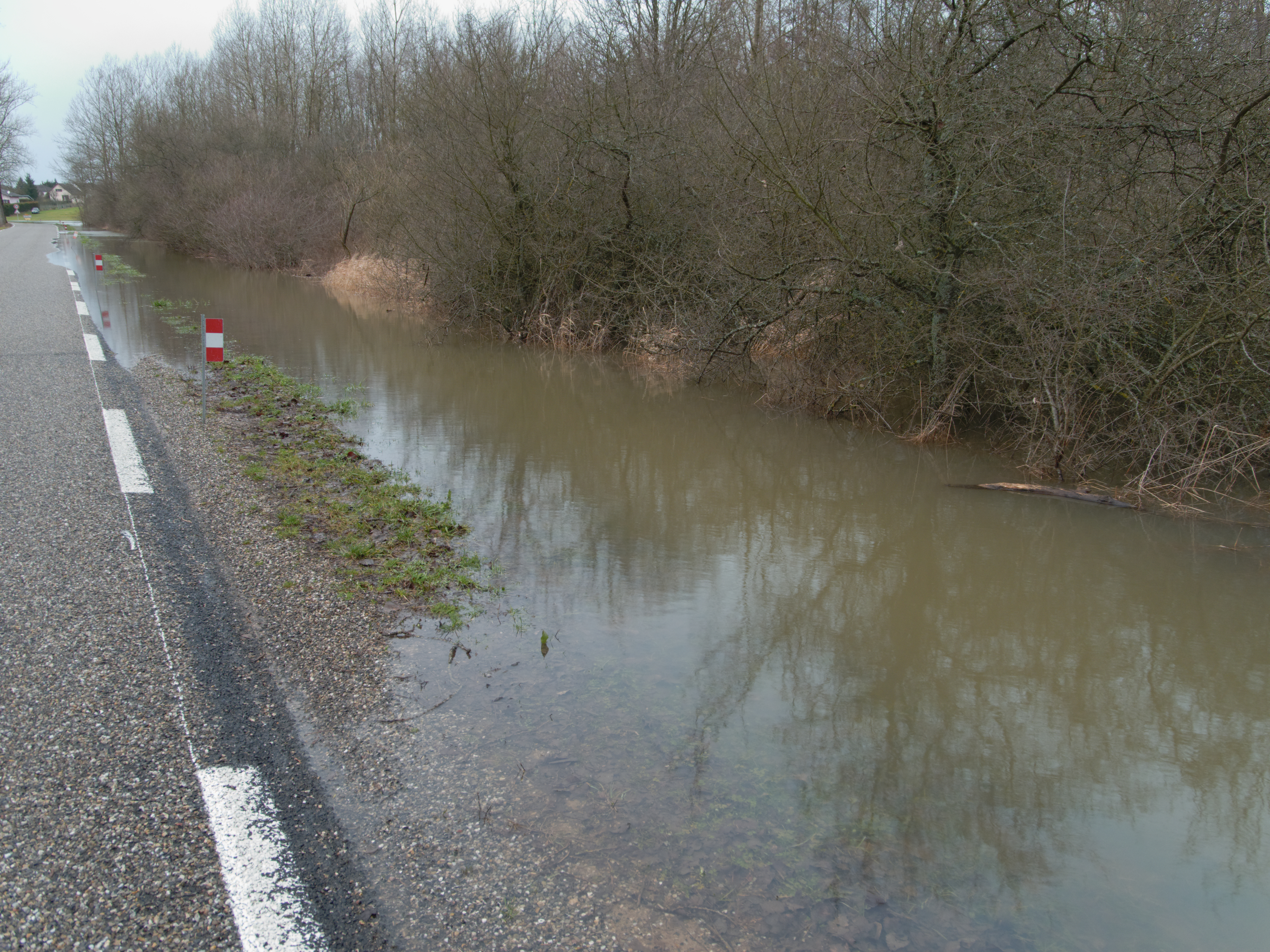

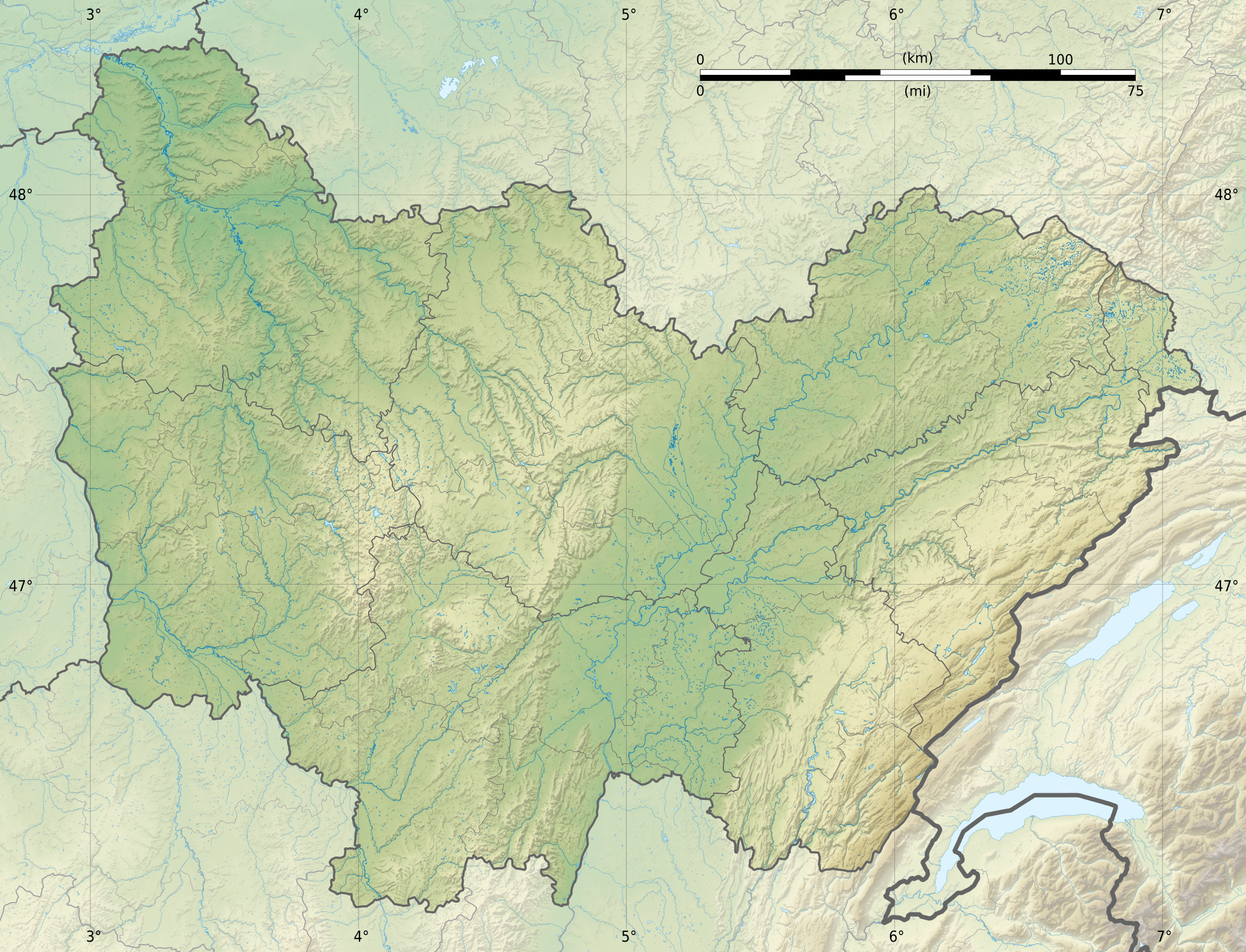
- Location within France Location within Bourgogne-Franche-Comté

Location
- Country: France

Physical characteristics
- Mouth
  - location: Bourbeuse
  - coordinates: 47°35′36″N 6°58′29″E
  - elevation: 340 m (1,120 ft)
- Length: 25 km (16 mi)
- Basin size: 92 km^{2} (36 sq mi)

Basin features
- Progression: Bourbeuse→ Allan→ Doubs→ Saône→ Rhône→ Mediterranean Sea

The Madeleine (French pronunciation: [madlɛn]) is a river in north eastern France, in the Territoire de Belfort département. It is 25.4 km long, and its basin area is 92 km^{2}.

It begins in the Vosges mountains, near the commune of Lamadeleine-Val-des-Anges. It joins the river Saint-Nicolas in the village Bretagne at 340 m above sea level to form the river Bourbeuse. The river Bourbeuse is a tributary to the river Allan, which is a tributary to the river Doubs.

The Madeleine river flows through the communes of Étueffont, Anjoutey, Bourg-sous-Châtelet, Bethonvilliers, Lacollonge, Fontenelle, Petit-Croix and Novillard.

It is also a fishing area. The confluence with the Saint-Nicolas is in a marshy area.
