= Vellescot =

- Commune
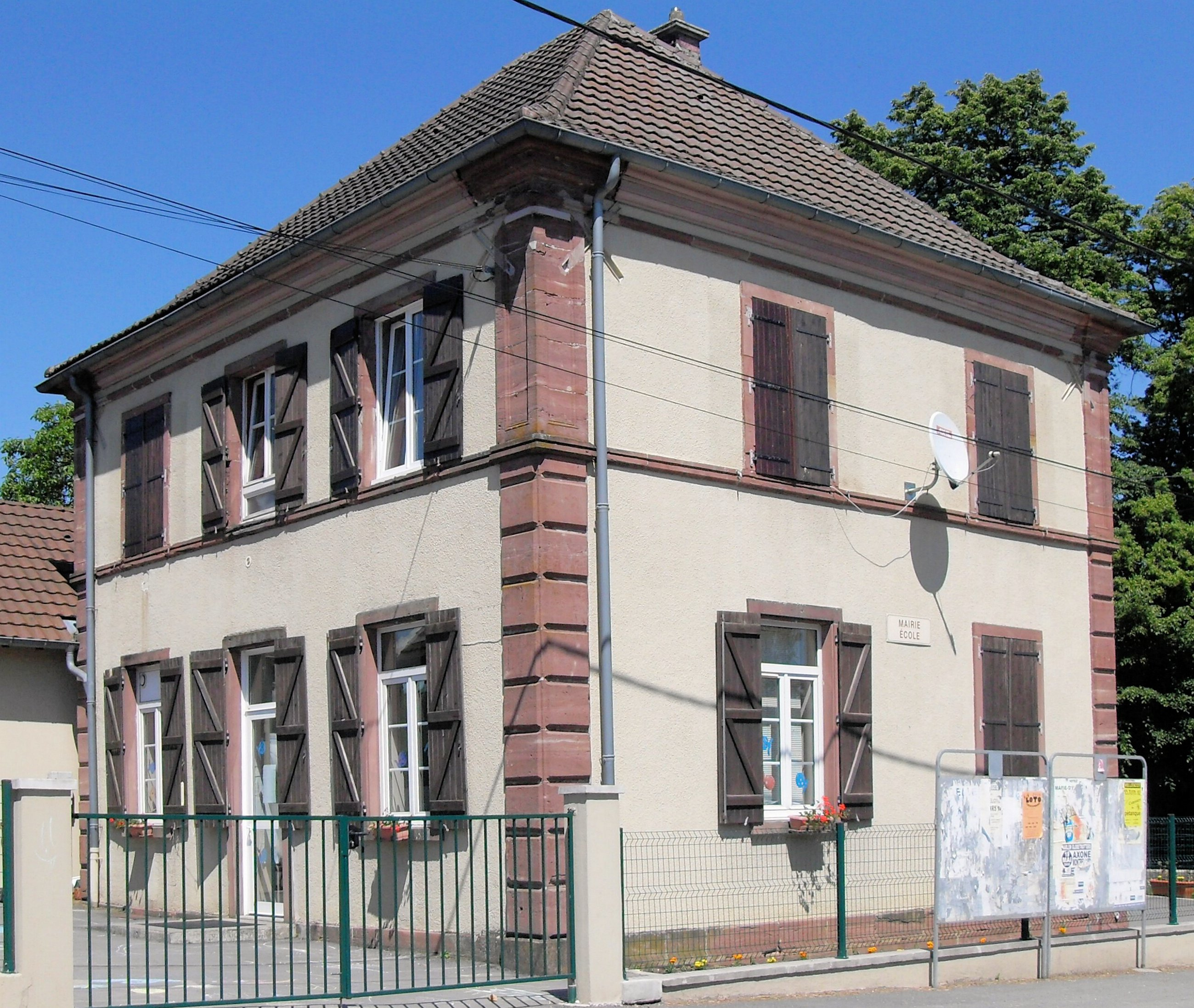
- Town hall
- Location of Vellescot
- Location within France Location within Bourgogne-Franche-Comté
- Coordinates: 47°34′22″N 7°00′54″E
- Country: France
- Region: Bourgogne-Franche-Comté
- Department: Territoire de Belfort
- Arrondissement: Belfort
- Canton: Grandvillars

Government
  - Mayor (2020–2026): Nicolas Bey
- Area^{1}: 3.55 km^{2} (1.37 sq mi)
- Population (2023): 257
  - Density: 72.4/km^{2} (188/sq mi)
- Time zone: UTC+01:00 (CET)
  - Summer (DST): UTC+02:00 (CEST)
- INSEE/Postal code: 90101 /90100
- ^{1} French Land Register data, which excludes lakes, ponds, glaciers > 1 km^{2} (0.386 sq mi or 247 acres) and river estuaries.

Vellescot (French pronunciation: [vɛlɛsko]) is a commune in the Territoire de Belfort department in Bourgogne-Franche-Comté in northeastern France.

== Geography ==
The village is located on the secondary road départementale D13 which connects Belfort to Suarce, 16 km (9.9 mi) from Belfort. Primarily agricultural, it is surrounded by forests and ponds whose formation is supported by the impermeable clay soil.

== History ==
In the Gallo-Roman era, a minor road connecting Delle with Froidefontaine crossed Boron and Vellescot. A section of a hundred meters length was excavated around 1851. The first mention of the name of Vellecort is in the charter of equipment of the priory of Froidefontaine on 8 March 1105. The village then formed part of the town hall and the parish of Grosne and returned in 1125 to Frederic, count of Ferrette. In the Austrian period, which lasted from the middle of the fourteenth to the middle of the sixteenth century, the name of the village was Germanized to Hanendorf. Before the Second World War a metric gauge railroad of local interest ran between Belfort and Réchésy, which crossed Grosne, Vellescot and Suarce.

== See also ==
- Communes of the Territoire de Belfort department
