= 90055 =

90055 could be a postal code for:

- Los Angeles, California, a city in California, United States
- Grosne, a commune in the Territoire del Belfort département, France
- Pattada, a comune in the province of Sassari, Sardinia, Italy
