= Reppe =

Reppe can refer to:

- Christiane Reppe, German Paralympian
- Walter Reppe, German chemist
- Reppe, Territoire de Belfort, French commune
