= Arrondissement of Belfort =

Coordinates: 47°38′23″N 6°51′50″E

Belfort
- Arrondissement
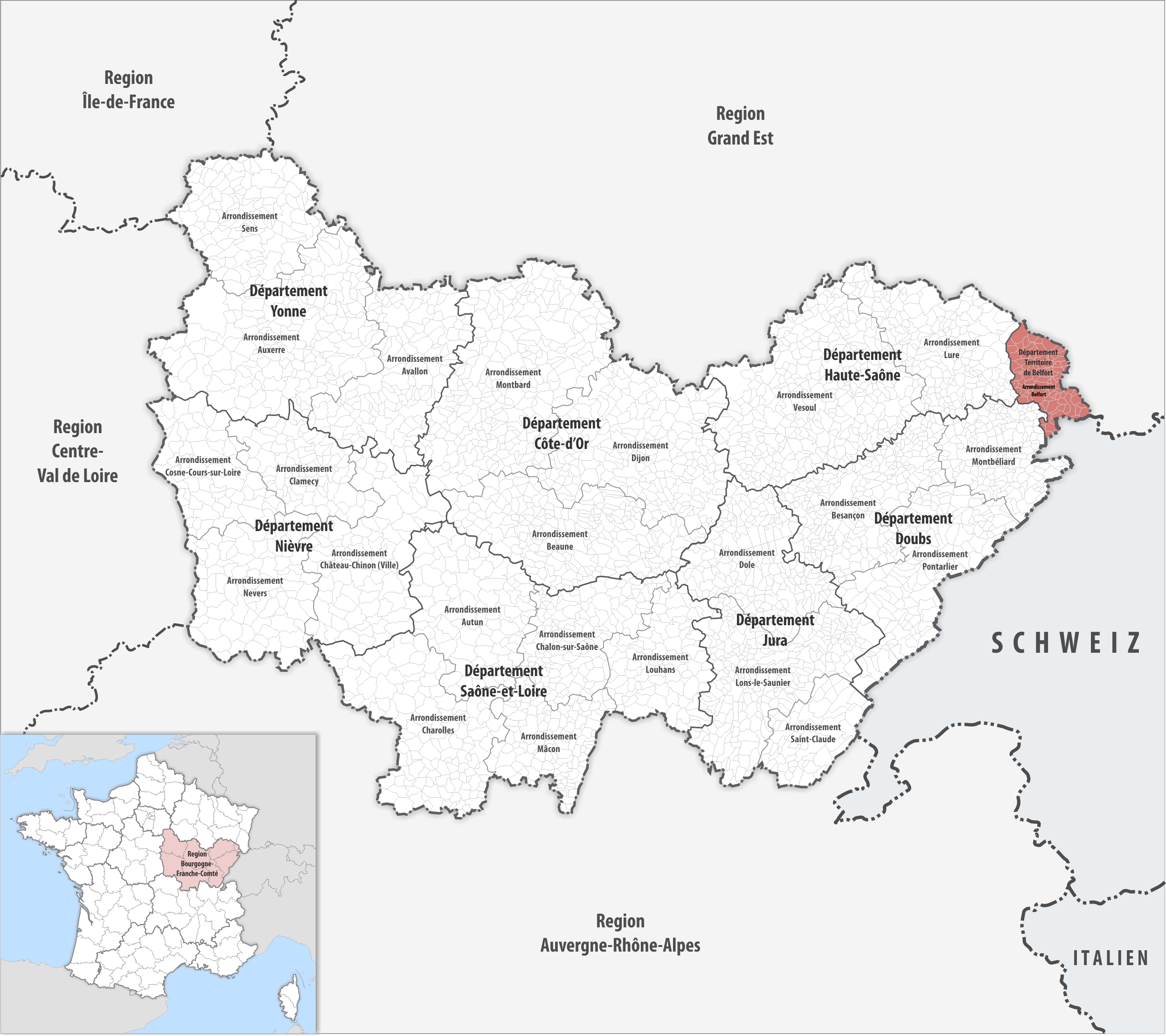
- Location within the region Bourgogne-Franche-Comté
- Country: France
- Region: Bourgogne-Franche-Comté
- Department: Territoire de Belfort
- No. of communes: {{{nbcomm}}}
- Area: 609.4 km^{2} (235.3 sq mi)
- Population (2023): 140,255
  - Density: 230.2/km^{2} (596.1/sq mi)
- INSEE code: 901

The arrondissement of Belfort is an arrondissement in the Bourgogne-Franche-Comté region of France. It is the only arrondissement of the Territoire de Belfort department. It has 101 communes. Its population is 139,654 (2021), and its area is 609.4 km^{2} (235.3 sq mi).

== Composition ==
The communes of the arrondissement of Belfort are:

1. Andelnans (90001)
2. Angeot (90002)
3. Anjoutey (90003)
4. Argiésans (90004)
5. Autrechêne (90082)
6. Auxelles-Bas (90005)
7. Auxelles-Haut (90006)
8. Banvillars (90007)
9. Bavilliers (90008)
10. Beaucourt (90009)
11. Belfort (90010)
12. Bermont (90011)
13. Bessoncourt (90012)
14. Bethonvilliers (90013)
15. Boron (90014)
16. Botans (90015)
17. Bourg-sous-Châtelet (90016)
18. Bourogne (90017)
19. Brebotte (90018)
20. Bretagne (90019)
21. Buc (90020)
22. Charmois (90021)
23. Châtenois-les-Forges (90022)
24. Chaux (90023)
25. Chavanatte (90024)
26. Chavannes-les-Grands (90025)
27. Chèvremont (90026)
28. Courcelles (90027)
29. Courtelevant (90028)
30. Cravanche (90029)
31. Croix (90030)
32. Cunelières (90031)
33. Danjoutin (90032)
34. Delle (90033)
35. Denney (90034)
36. Dorans (90035)
37. Eguenigue (90036)
38. Éloie (90037)
39. Essert (90039)
40. Étueffont (90041)
41. Évette-Salbert (90042)
42. Faverois (90043)
43. Fêche-l'Église (90045)
44. Felon (90044)
45. Florimont (90046)
46. Fontaine (90047)
47. Fontenelle (90048)
48. Foussemagne (90049)
49. Frais (90050)
50. Froidefontaine (90051)
51. Giromagny (90052)
52. Grandvillars (90053)
53. Grosmagny (90054)
54. Grosne (90055)
55. Joncherey (90056)
56. Lachapelle-sous-Chaux (90057)
57. Lachapelle-sous-Rougemont (90058)
58. Lacollonge (90059)
59. Lagrange (90060)
60. Lamadeleine-Val-des-Anges (90061)
61. Larivière (90062)
62. Lebetain (90063)
63. Lepuix (90065)
64. Lepuix-Neuf (90064)
65. Leval (90066)
66. Menoncourt (90067)
67. Meroux-Moval (90068)
68. Méziré (90069)
69. Montbouton (90070)
70. Montreux-Château (90071)
71. Morvillars (90072)
72. Novillard (90074)
73. Offemont (90075)
74. Pérouse (90076)
75. Petit-Croix (90077)
76. Petitefontaine (90078)
77. Petitmagny (90079)
78. Phaffans (90080)
79. Réchésy (90081)
80. Recouvrance (90083)
81. Reppe (90084)
82. Riervescemont (90085)
83. Romagny-sous-Rougemont (90086)
84. Roppe (90087)
85. Rougegoutte (90088)
86. Rougemont-le-Château (90089)
87. Saint-Dizier-l'Évêque (90090)
88. Saint-Germain-le-Châtelet (90091)
89. Sermamagny (90093)
90. Sevenans (90094)
91. Suarce (90095)
92. Thiancourt (90096)
93. Trévenans (90097)
94. Urcerey (90098)
95. Valdoie (90099)
96. Vauthiermont (90100)
97. Vellescot (90101)
98. Vescemont (90102)
99. Vétrigne (90103)
100. Vézelois (90104)
101. Villars-le-Sec (90105)

== Demography ==
Historical population
Year	Pop.	±% p.a.
1968	118,450	—
1975	128,125	+1.13%
1982	131,999	+0.43%
1990	134,097	+0.20%
1999	137,408	+0.27%
2007	142,444	+0.45%
2012	143,940	+0.21%
2017	142,622	−0.18%
2023	140,255	−0.28%
Source: INSEE

== History ==
The arrondissement of Belfort was created in 1800 as a part of the department Haut-Rhin. This arrondissement was larger than the current one, and also included part that is now in the department Haut-Rhin, for instance the communes Cernay, Dannemarie, Masevaux, Saint-Amarin and Thann. In 1871, when most of Haut-Rhin was ceded to Germany, the part remaining in France became the Territoire de Belfort.

As a result of the reorganisation of the cantons of France which came into effect in 2015, the borders of the cantons are no longer related to the borders of the arrondissements. The cantons of the arrondissement of Belfort were, as of January 2015:

1. Beaucourt
2. Belfort-Centre
3. Belfort-Est
4. Belfort-Nord
5. Belfort-Ouest
6. Belfort-Sud
7. Châtenois-les-Forges
8. Danjoutin
9. Delle
10. Fontaine
11. Giromagny
12. Grandvillars
13. Offemont
14. Rougemont-le-Château
15. Valdoie
