= Communes of the Territoire de Belfort department =

The following is a list of the 101 communes of the Territoire de Belfort department of France.

The communes cooperate in the following intercommunalities (as of 2025):

- Communauté d'agglomération Grand Belfort
- Communauté de communes du Sud Territoire
- Communauté de communes des Vosges du Sud

INSEE code	Postal code	Commune
90001	90400	Andelnans
90002	90150	Angeot
90003	90170	Anjoutey
90004	90800	Argiésans
90082	90140	Autrechêne
90005	90200	Auxelles-Bas
90006	90200	Auxelles-Haut
90007	90800	Banvillars
90008	90800	Bavilliers
90009	90500	Beaucourt
90010	90000	Belfort
90011	90400	Bermont
90012	90160	Bessoncourt
90013	90150	Bethonvilliers
90014	90100	Boron
90015	90400	Botans
90016	90110	Bourg-sous-Châtelet
90017	90140	Bourogne
90018	90140	Brebotte
90019	90130	Bretagne
90020	90800	Buc
90021	90140	Charmois
90022	90700	Châtenois-les-Forges
90023	90330	Chaux
90024	90100	Chavanatte
90025	90100	Chavannes-les-Grands
90026	90340	Chèvremont
90027	90100	Courcelles
90028	90100	Courtelevant
90029	90300	Cravanche
90030	90100	Croix
90031	90150	Cunelières
90032	90400	Danjoutin
90033	90100	Delle
90034	90160	Denney
90035	90400	Dorans
90036	90150	Eguenigue
90037	90300	Éloie
90039	90850	Essert
90041	90170	Étueffont
90042	90350	Évette-Salbert
90043	90100	Faverois
90045	90100	Fêche-l'Église
90044	90110	Felon
90046	90100	Florimont
90047	90150	Fontaine
90048	90340	Fontenelle
90049	90150	Foussemagne
90050	90150	Frais
90051	90140	Froidefontaine
90052	90200	Giromagny

INSEE code	Postal code	Commune
90053	90600	Grandvillars
90054	90200	Grosmagny
90055	90100	Grosne
90056	90100	Joncherey
90057	90300	Lachapelle-sous-Chaux
90058	90360	Lachapelle-sous-Rougemont
90059	90150	Lacollonge
90060	90150	Lagrange
90061	90170	Lamadeleine-Val-des-Anges
90062	90150	Larivière
90063	90100	Lebetain
90065	90200	Lepuix
90064	90100	Lepuix-Neuf
90066	90110	Leval
90067	90150	Menoncourt
90068	90400	Meroux-Moval
90069	90120	Méziré
90070	90500	Montbouton
90071	90130	Montreux-Château
90072	90120	Morvillars
90074	90340	Novillard
90075	90300	Offemont
90076	90160	Pérouse
90077	90130	Petit-Croix
90078	90360	Petitefontaine
90079	90170	Petitmagny
90080	90150	Phaffans
90081	90370	Réchésy
90083	90140	Recouvrance
90084	90150	Reppe
90085	90200	Riervescemont
90086	90110	Romagny-sous-Rougemont
90087	90380	Roppe
90088	90200	Rougegoutte
90089	90110	Rougemont-le-Château
90090	90100	Saint-Dizier-l'Évêque
90091	90110	Saint-Germain-le-Châtelet
90093	90300	Sermamagny
90094	90400	Sevenans
90095	90100	Suarce
90096	90100	Thiancourt
90097	90400	Trévenans
90098	90800	Urcerey
90099	90300	Valdoie
90100	90150	Vauthiermont
90101	90100	Vellescot
90102	90200	Vescemont
90103	90300	Vétrigne
90104	90400	Vézelois
90105	90100	Villars-le-Sec

== See also ==
- Lists of communes of France
- Administrative divisions of France
