= Lagrange, Territoire de Belfort =

Lagrange
- Commune
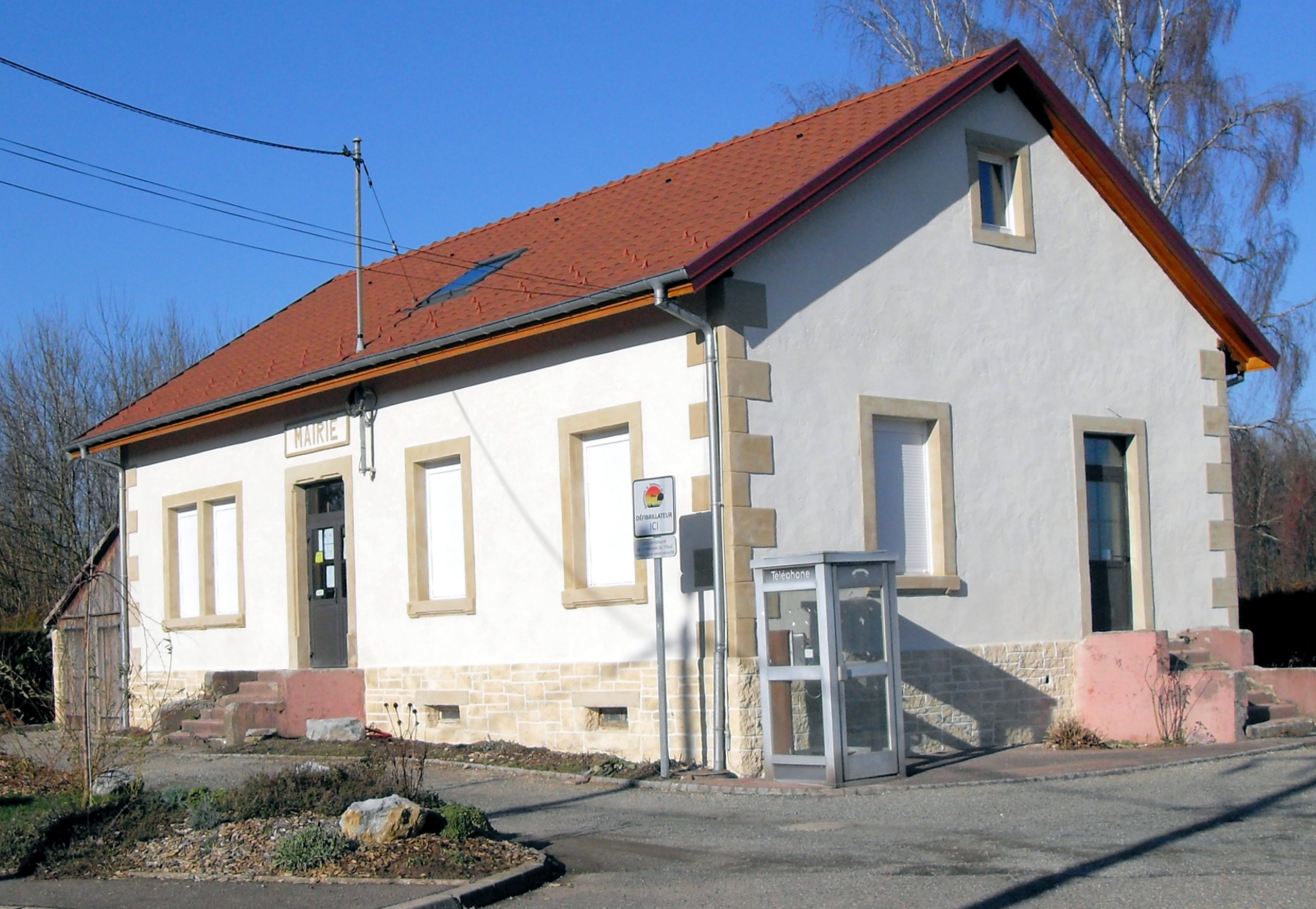
- Town hall

- Coat of arms
- Location of Lagrange
- Location within France Location within Bourgogne-Franche-Comté
- Coordinates: 47°40′52″N 6°58′48″E
- Country: France
- Region: Bourgogne-Franche-Comté
- Department: Territoire de Belfort
- Arrondissement: Belfort
- Canton: Grandvillars
- Intercommunality: Grand Belfort

Government
  - Mayor (2020–2026): Bernard Georges Guerre-Genton
- Area^{1}: 0.93 km^{2} (0.36 sq mi)
- Highest elevation: 383 m (1,257 ft)
- Lowest elevation: 362 m (1,188 ft)
- Population (2023): 144
  - Density: 150/km^{2} (400/sq mi)
- Time zone: UTC+01:00 (CET)
  - Summer (DST): UTC+02:00 (CEST)
- INSEE/Postal code: 90060 /90150
- ^{1} French Land Register data, which excludes lakes, ponds, glaciers > 1 km^{2} (0.386 sq mi or 247 acres) and river estuaries.

Lagrange (French pronunciation: [laɡʁɑ̃ʒ]) is a commune in the Territoire de Belfort department in Bourgogne-Franche-Comté in northeastern France.

== See also ==
- Communes of the Territoire de Belfort department
