= Larivière, Territoire de Belfort =

Larivière
- Commune
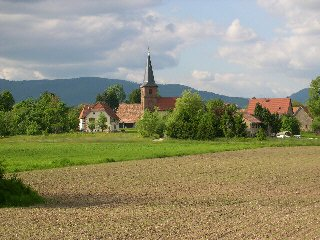
- Overview
- Location of Larivière
- Location within France Location within Bourgogne-Franche-Comté
- Coordinates: 47°40′37″N 6°59′55″E
- Country: France
- Region: Bourgogne-Franche-Comté
- Department: Territoire de Belfort
- Arrondissement: Belfort
- Canton: Grandvillars
- Intercommunality: Grand Belfort

Government
  - Mayor (2020–2026): Marc Blondé
- Area^{1}: 4.84 km^{2} (1.87 sq mi)
- Highest elevation: 381 m (1,250 ft)
- Lowest elevation: 354 m (1,161 ft)
- Population (2023): 282
  - Density: 58.3/km^{2} (151/sq mi)
- Time zone: UTC+01:00 (CET)
  - Summer (DST): UTC+02:00 (CEST)
- INSEE/Postal code: 90062 /90150
- ^{1} French Land Register data, which excludes lakes, ponds, glaciers > 1 km^{2} (0.386 sq mi or 247 acres) and river estuaries.

Larivière (French pronunciation: [laʁivjɛʁ]) is a commune in the Territoire de Belfort department in Bourgogne-Franche-Comté in northeastern France.

== See also ==
- Communes of the Territoire de Belfort department
