= Cunelières =

- Commune
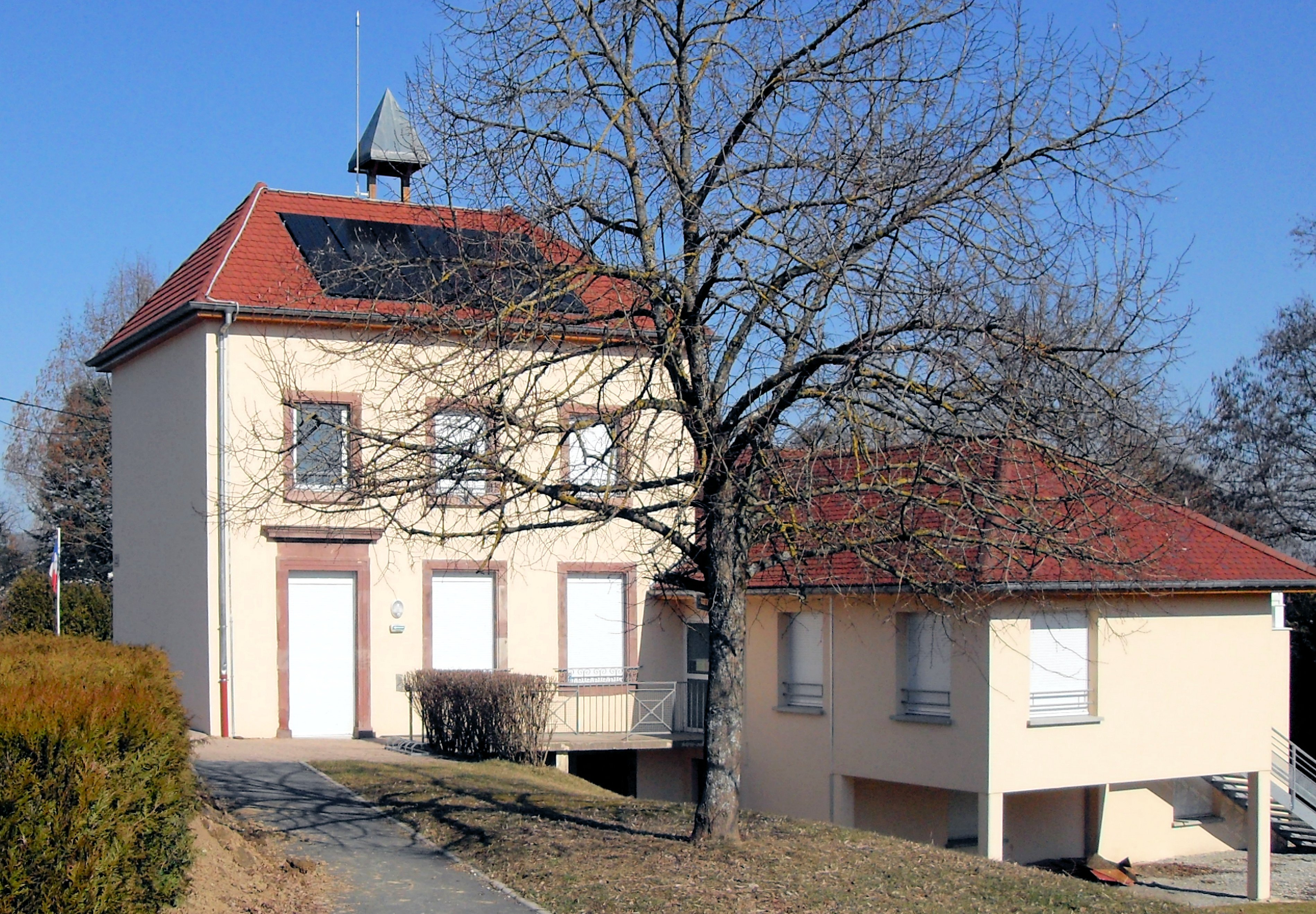
- Town hall

- Coat of arms
- Location of Cunelières
- Location within France Location within Bourgogne-Franche-Comté
- Coordinates: 47°37′36″N 6°59′52″E
- Country: France
- Region: Bourgogne-Franche-Comté
- Department: Territoire de Belfort
- Arrondissement: Belfort
- Canton: Grandvillars
- Intercommunality: Grand Belfort

Government
  - Mayor (2020–2026): Henri Ostermann
- Area^{1}: 2.02 km^{2} (0.78 sq mi)
- Highest elevation: 366 m (1,201 ft)
- Lowest elevation: 340 m (1,120 ft)
- Population (2023): 341
  - Density: 169/km^{2} (437/sq mi)
- Time zone: UTC+01:00 (CET)
  - Summer (DST): UTC+02:00 (CEST)
- INSEE/Postal code: 90031 /90150
- ^{1} French Land Register data, which excludes lakes, ponds, glaciers > 1 km^{2} (0.386 sq mi or 247 acres) and river estuaries.

Cunelières (French pronunciation: [kynəljɛʁ]) is a commune in the Territoire de Belfort department in Bourgogne-Franche-Comté in northeastern France.

== See also ==
- Communes of the Territoire de Belfort department
