= Autrechêne =

- Commune
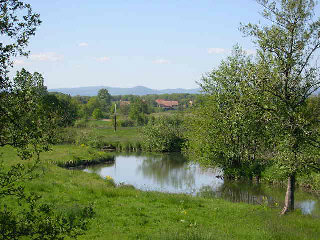
- Landscape around Autrechêne

- Coat of arms
- Location of Autrechêne
- Location within France Location within Bourgogne-Franche-Comté
- Coordinates: 47°35′45″N 6°57′37″E
- Country: France
- Region: Bourgogne-Franche-Comté
- Department: Territoire de Belfort
- Arrondissement: Belfort
- Canton: Grandvillars
- Intercommunality: Grand Belfort

Government
  - Mayor (2020–2026): Corinne Aymonier
- Area^{1}: 2.96 km^{2} (1.14 sq mi)
- Highest elevation: 368 m (1,207 ft)
- Lowest elevation: 333 m (1,093 ft)
- Population (2023): 281
  - Density: 94.9/km^{2} (246/sq mi)
- Time zone: UTC+01:00 (CET)
  - Summer (DST): UTC+02:00 (CEST)
- INSEE/Postal code: 90082 /90140
- ^{1} French Land Register data, which excludes lakes, ponds, glaciers > 1 km^{2} (0.386 sq mi or 247 acres) and river estuaries.

Autrechêne (French pronunciation: [otʁəʃɛn]) is a commune in the Territoire de Belfort department in Bourgogne-Franche-Comté in northeastern France.

== See also ==
- Communes of the Territoire de Belfort department
