= Bessoncourt =

- Commune
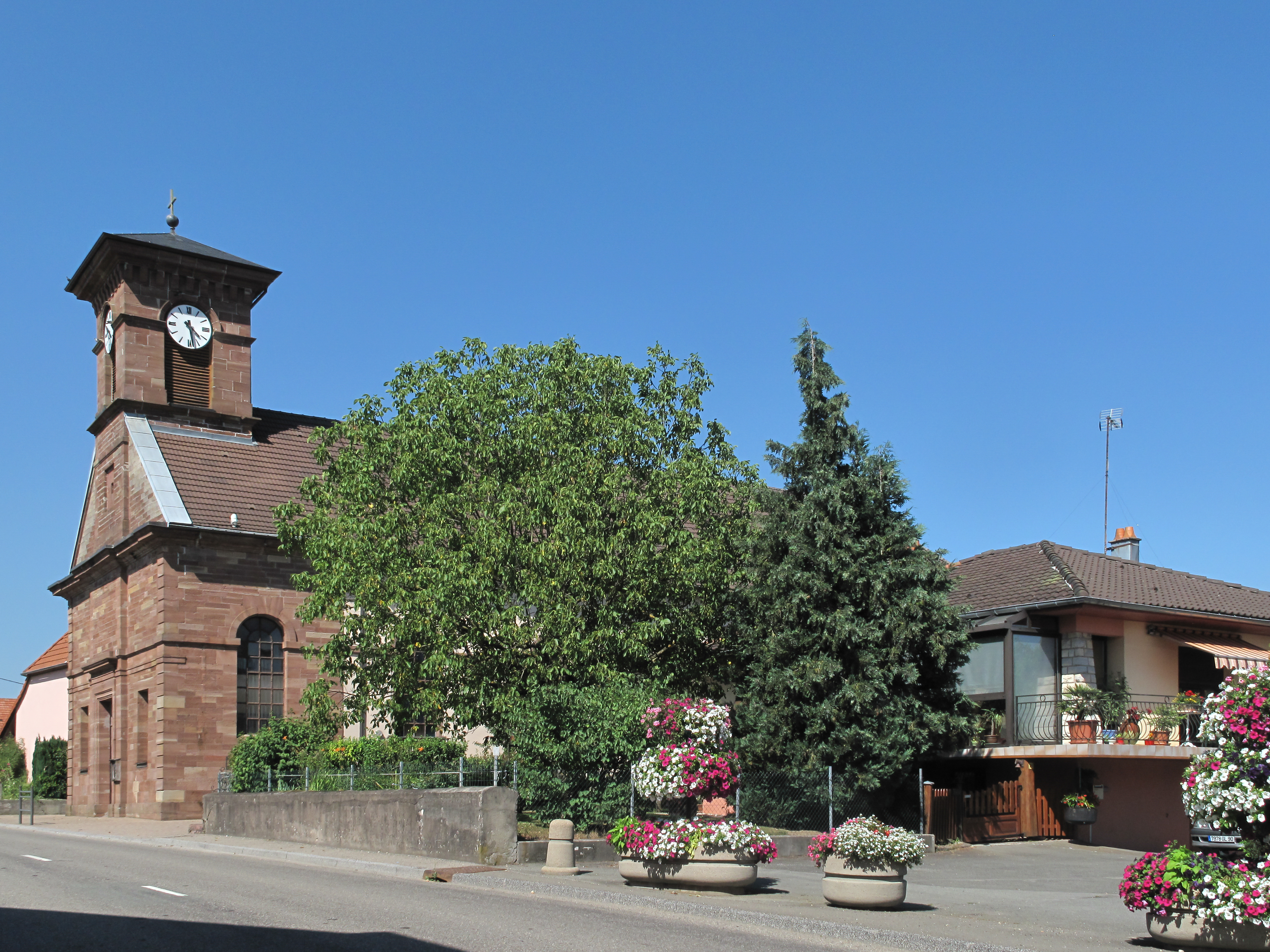
- The church of Sainte-Suzanne, viewed from the road in Bessoncourt

- Coat of arms
- Location of Bessoncourt
- Location within France Location within Bourgogne-Franche-Comté
- Coordinates: 47°38′47″N 6°55′59″E
- Country: France
- Region: Bourgogne-Franche-Comté
- Department: Territoire de Belfort
- Arrondissement: Belfort
- Canton: Grandvillars
- Intercommunality: Grand Belfort

Government
  - Mayor (2020–2026): Thierry Besançon
- Area^{1}: 7.80 km^{2} (3.01 sq mi)
- Highest elevation: 381 m (1,250 ft)
- Lowest elevation: 340 m (1,120 ft)
- Population (2023): 1,309
  - Density: 168/km^{2} (435/sq mi)
- Time zone: UTC+01:00 (CET)
  - Summer (DST): UTC+02:00 (CEST)
- INSEE/Postal code: 90012 /90160
- ^{1} French Land Register data, which excludes lakes, ponds, glaciers > 1 km^{2} (0.386 sq mi or 247 acres) and river estuaries.

Bessoncourt (French pronunciation: [bɛsɔ̃kuʁ]) is a commune in the Territoire de Belfort department in Bourgogne-Franche-Comté in northeastern France.

== See also ==
- Communes of the Territoire de Belfort department
