= Phaffans =

- Commune
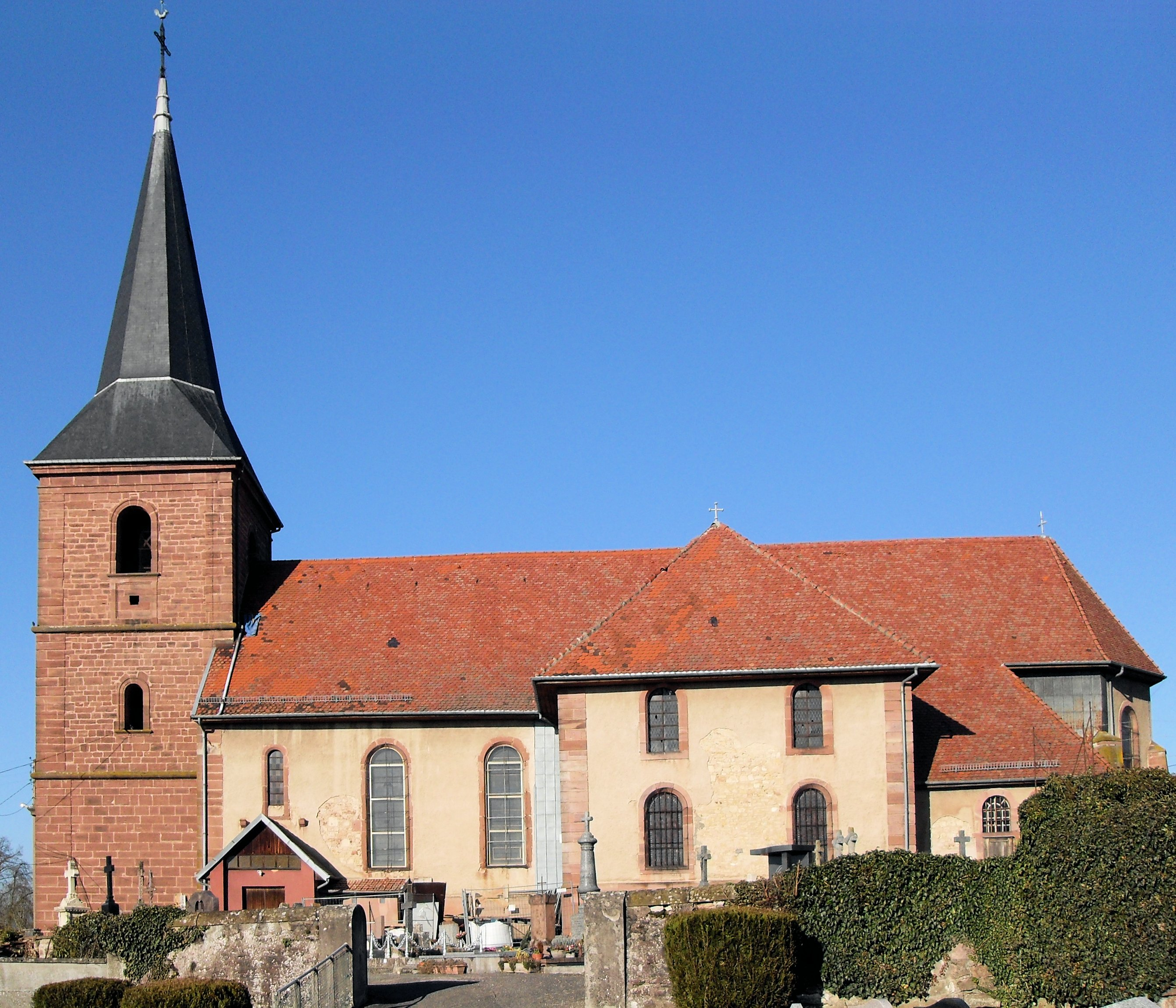
- Church (Notre-Dame de l'Assomption)

- Coat of arms
- Location of Phaffans
- Location within France Location within Bourgogne-Franche-Comté
- Coordinates: 47°39′39″N 6°56′07″E
- Country: France
- Region: Bourgogne-Franche-Comté
- Department: Territoire de Belfort
- Arrondissement: Belfort
- Canton: Grandvillars
- Intercommunality: CA Grand Belfort

Government
  - Mayor (2020–2026): Christine Bainier
- Area^{1}: 3.24 km^{2} (1.25 sq mi)
- Highest elevation: 381 m (1,250 ft)
- Lowest elevation: 345 m (1,132 ft)
- Population (2023): 432
  - Density: 133/km^{2} (345/sq mi)
- Time zone: UTC+01:00 (CET)
  - Summer (DST): UTC+02:00 (CEST)
- INSEE/Postal code: 90080 /90150
- ^{1} French Land Register data, which excludes lakes, ponds, glaciers > 1 km^{2} (0.386 sq mi or 247 acres) and river estuaries.

Phaffans (French pronunciation: [fafɑ̃]) is a commune in the Territoire de Belfort department in Bourgogne-Franche-Comté in northeastern France.

== See also ==
- Communes of the Territoire de Belfort department
