= Montreux-Château =

- Commune
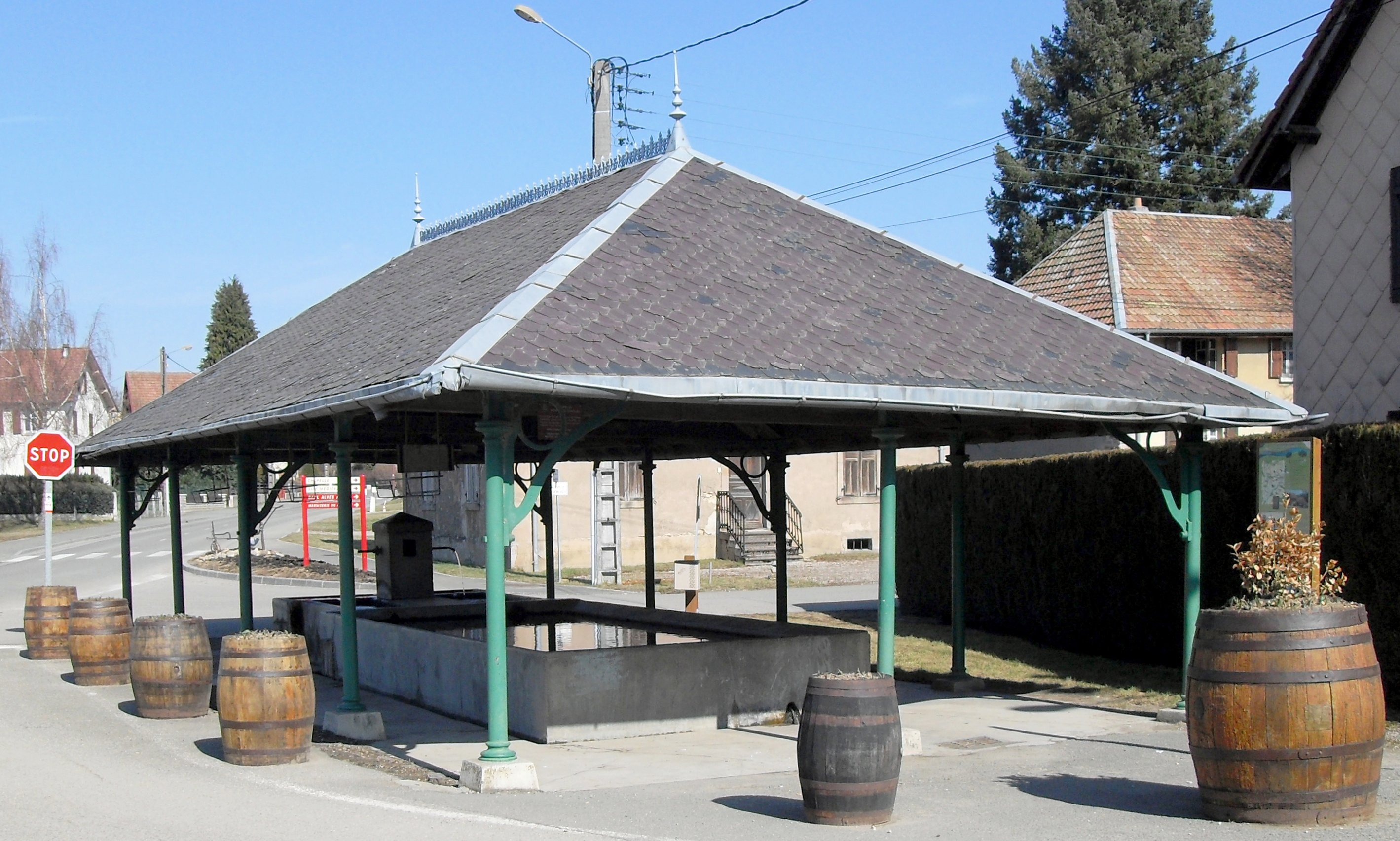
- Lavoir

- Coat of arms
- Location of Montreux-Château
- Location within France Location within Bourgogne-Franche-Comté
- Coordinates: 47°36′40″N 7°00′06″E
- Country: France
- Region: Bourgogne-Franche-Comté
- Department: Territoire de Belfort
- Arrondissement: Belfort
- Canton: Grandvillars
- Intercommunality: Grand Belfort

Government
  - Mayor (2023–2026): Michael Brun
- Area^{1}: 4.66 km^{2} (1.80 sq mi)
- Highest elevation: 366 m (1,201 ft)
- Lowest elevation: 336 m (1,102 ft)
- Population (2023): 1,180
  - Density: 253/km^{2} (656/sq mi)
- Time zone: UTC+01:00 (CET)
  - Summer (DST): UTC+02:00 (CEST)
- INSEE/Postal code: 90071 /90130
- ^{1} French Land Register data, which excludes lakes, ponds, glaciers > 1 km^{2} (0.386 sq mi or 247 acres) and river estuaries.

Montreux-Château (French pronunciation: [mɔ̃tʁø ʃato]) is a commune in the Territoire de Belfort department in Bourgogne-Franche-Comté in northeastern France.

== See also ==
- Communes of the Territoire de Belfort department
