= Menoncourt =

- Commune
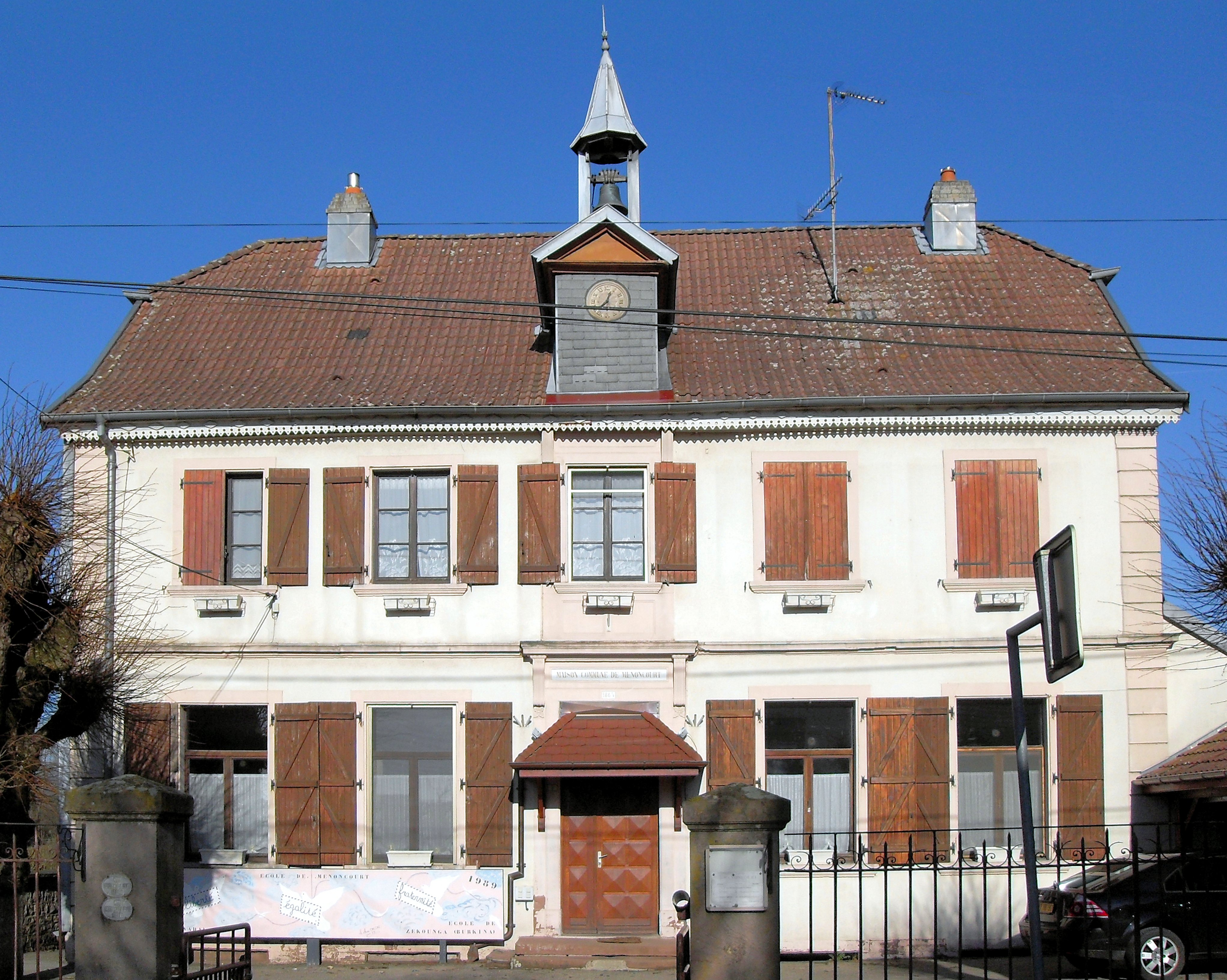
- Town hall

- Coat of arms
- Location of Menoncourt
- Location within France Location within Bourgogne-Franche-Comté
- Coordinates: 47°40′16″N 6°56′41″E
- Country: France
- Region: Bourgogne-Franche-Comté
- Department: Territoire de Belfort
- Arrondissement: Belfort
- Canton: Grandvillars
- Intercommunality: Grand Belfort

Government
  - Mayor (2020–2026): Michael Jäger
- Area^{1}: 4.70 km^{2} (1.81 sq mi)
- Highest elevation: 461 m (1,512 ft)
- Lowest elevation: 359 m (1,178 ft)
- Population (2023): 391
  - Density: 83.2/km^{2} (215/sq mi)
- Time zone: UTC+01:00 (CET)
  - Summer (DST): UTC+02:00 (CEST)
- INSEE/Postal code: 90067 /90150
- ^{1} French Land Register data, which excludes lakes, ponds, glaciers > 1 km^{2} (0.386 sq mi or 247 acres) and river estuaries.

Menoncourt (French pronunciation: [mənɔ̃kuʁ]) is a commune in the Territoire de Belfort department in Bourgogne-Franche-Comté in northeastern France.

== See also ==
- Communes of the Territoire de Belfort department
