= Brebotte =

- Commune
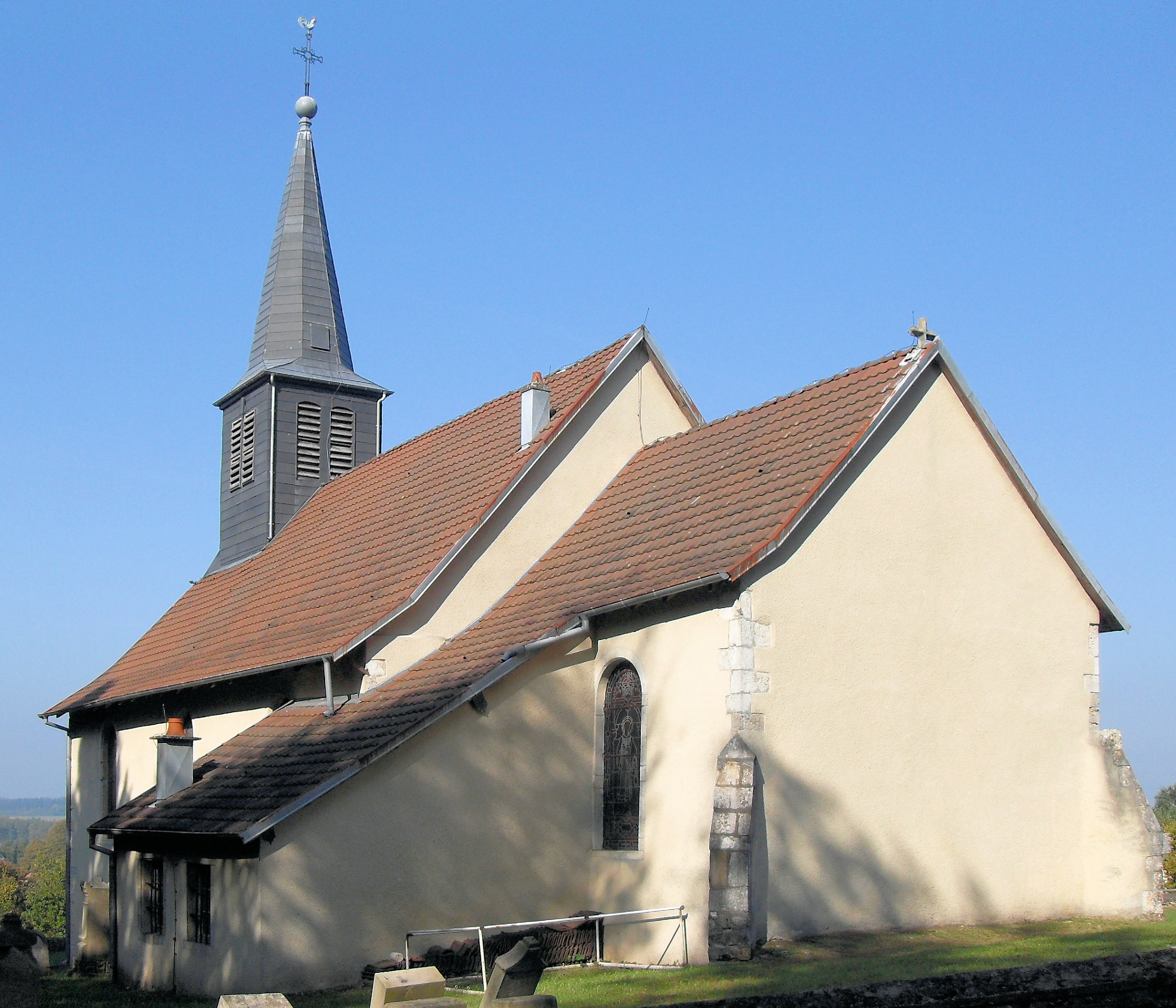
- Saint Etienne church

- Coat of arms
- Location of Brebotte
- Location within France Location within Bourgogne-Franche-Comté
- Coordinates: 47°34′44″N 6°58′24″E
- Country: France
- Region: Bourgogne-Franche-Comté
- Department: Territoire de Belfort
- Arrondissement: Belfort
- Canton: Grandvillars
- Intercommunality: Sud Territoire

Government
  - Mayor (2020–2026): Pierre Vallat
- Area^{1}: 3.78 km^{2} (1.46 sq mi)
- Highest elevation: 375 m (1,230 ft)
- Lowest elevation: 334 m (1,096 ft)
- Population (2023): 353
  - Density: 93.4/km^{2} (242/sq mi)
- Time zone: UTC+01:00 (CET)
  - Summer (DST): UTC+02:00 (CEST)
- INSEE/Postal code: 90018 /90140
- ^{1} French Land Register data, which excludes lakes, ponds, glaciers > 1 km^{2} (0.386 sq mi or 247 acres) and river estuaries.

Brebotte (French pronunciation: [bʁəbɔt]) is a commune in the Territoire de Belfort department in Bourgogne-Franche-Comté in northeastern France.

== See also ==
- Communes of the Territoire de Belfort department
