= Chavannes-les-Grands =

- Commune
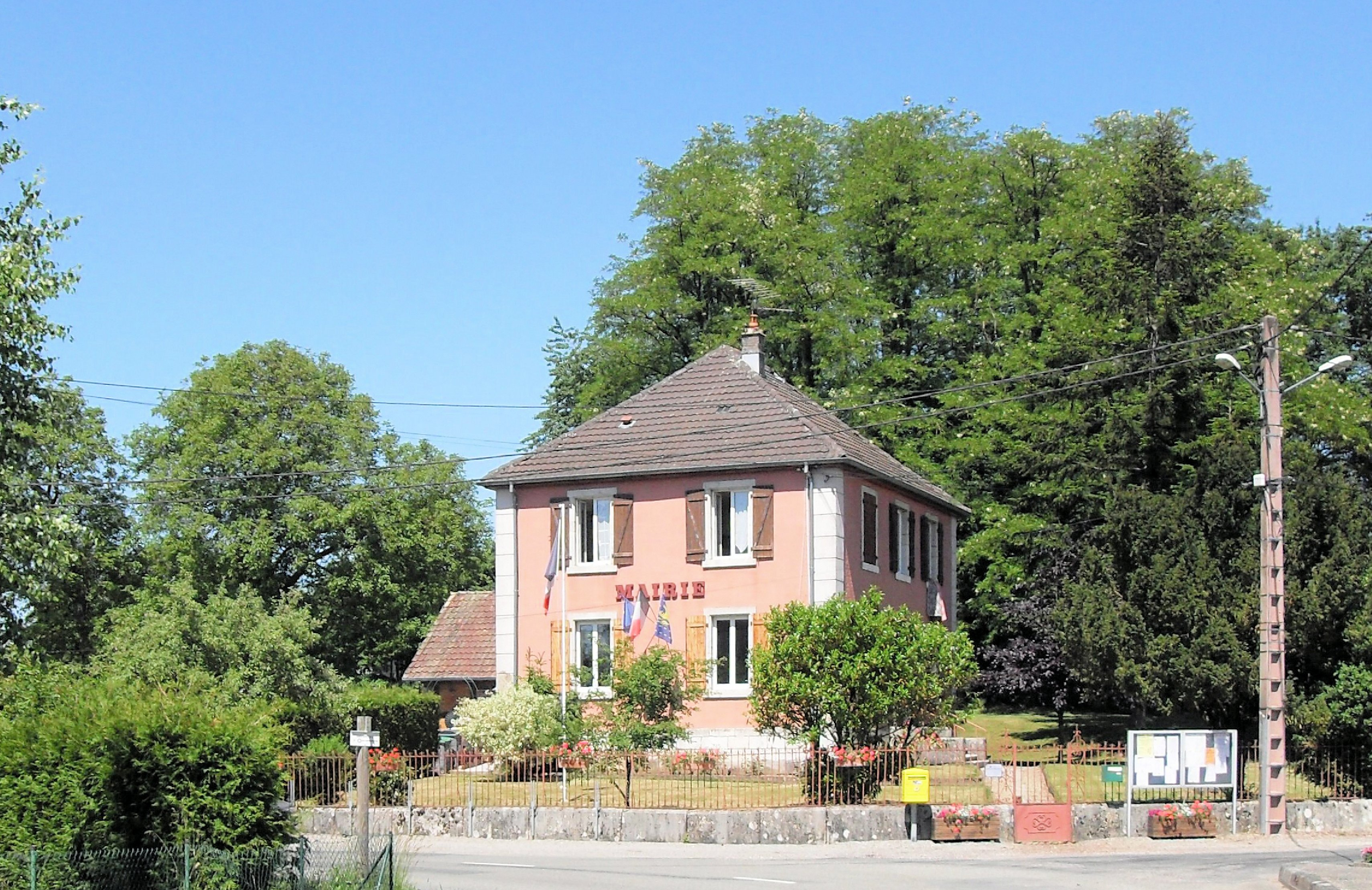
- The town hall of Chavannes-les-Grands

- Coat of arms
- Location of Chavannes-les-Grands
- Location within France Location within Bourgogne-Franche-Comté
- Coordinates: 47°35′31″N 7°02′51″E
- Country: France
- Region: Bourgogne-Franche-Comté
- Department: Territoire de Belfort
- Arrondissement: Belfort
- Canton: Grandvillars
- Intercommunality: Sud Territoire

Government
  - Mayor (2020–2026): Gérard Fesselet
- Area^{1}: 6.93 km^{2} (2.68 sq mi)
- Highest elevation: 385 m (1,263 ft)
- Lowest elevation: 354 m (1,161 ft)
- Population (2023): 345
  - Density: 49.8/km^{2} (129/sq mi)
- Time zone: UTC+01:00 (CET)
  - Summer (DST): UTC+02:00 (CEST)
- INSEE/Postal code: 90025 /90100
- ^{1} French Land Register data, which excludes lakes, ponds, glaciers > 1 km^{2} (0.386 sq mi or 247 acres) and river estuaries.

Chavannes-les-Grands (French pronunciation: [ʃavan le ɡʁɑ̃]) is a commune in the Territoire de Belfort department in Bourgogne-Franche-Comté in northeastern France.

== See also ==
- Communes of the Territoire de Belfort department
