= Recouvrance, Territoire de Belfort =

Recouvrance
- Commune
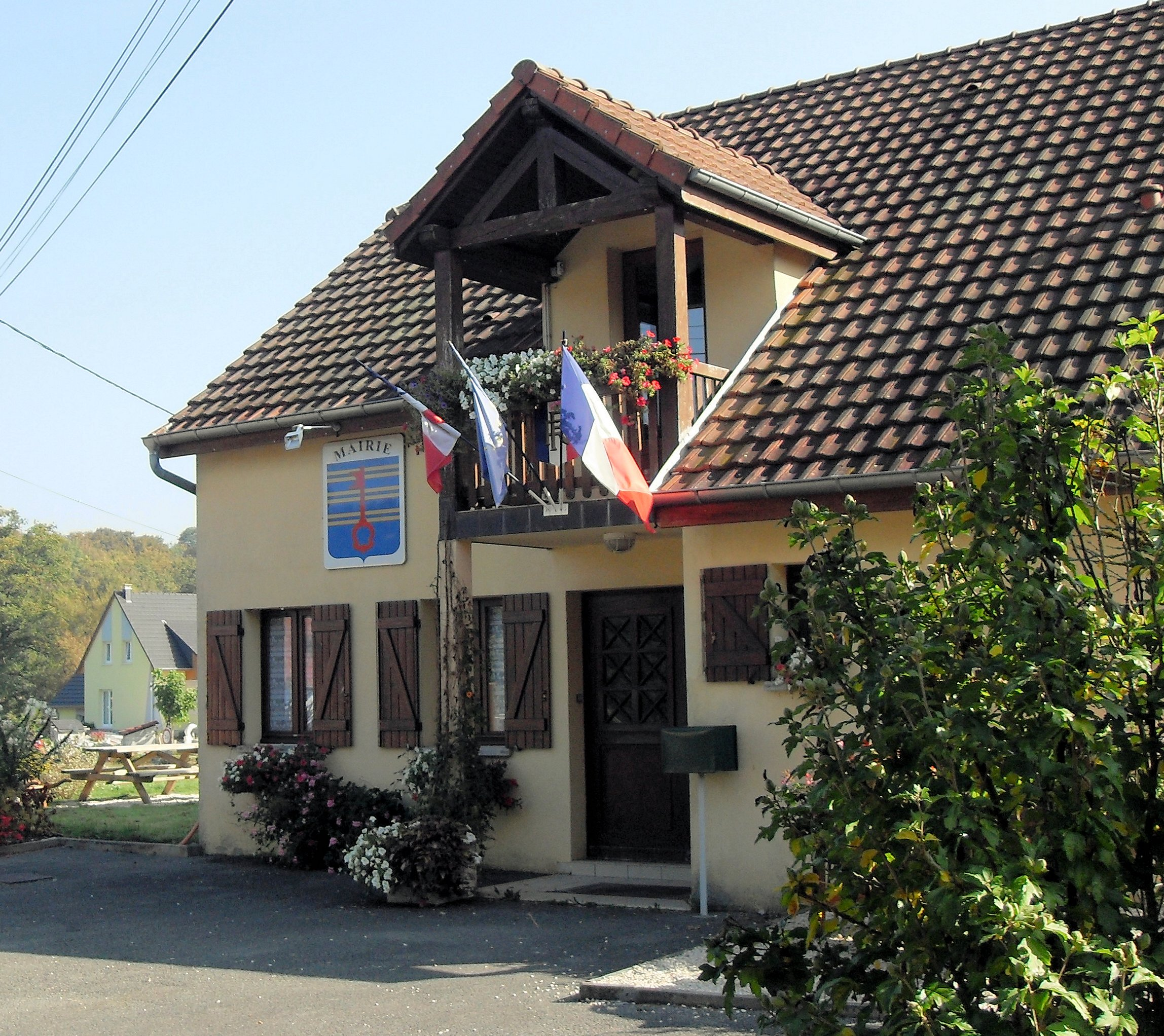
- Town hall

- Coat of arms
- Location of Recouvrance
- Location within France Location within Bourgogne-Franche-Comté
- Coordinates: 47°34′27″N 6°58′52″E
- Country: France
- Region: Bourgogne-Franche-Comté
- Department: Territoire de Belfort
- Arrondissement: Belfort
- Canton: Grandvillars

Government
  - Mayor (2020–2026): Jean Racine
- Area^{1}: 1.50 km^{2} (0.58 sq mi)
- Highest elevation: 382 m (1,253 ft)
- Lowest elevation: 340 m (1,120 ft)
- Population (2023): 147
  - Density: 98.0/km^{2} (254/sq mi)
- Time zone: UTC+01:00 (CET)
  - Summer (DST): UTC+02:00 (CEST)
- INSEE/Postal code: 90083 /90140
- ^{1} French Land Register data, which excludes lakes, ponds, glaciers > 1 km^{2} (0.386 sq mi or 247 acres) and river estuaries.

Recouvrance (French pronunciation: [ʁəkuvʁɑ̃s]) is a commune in the Territoire de Belfort department in Bourgogne-Franche-Comté in northeastern France.

== See also ==
- Communes of the Territoire de Belfort department
