= Angeot =

- Commune
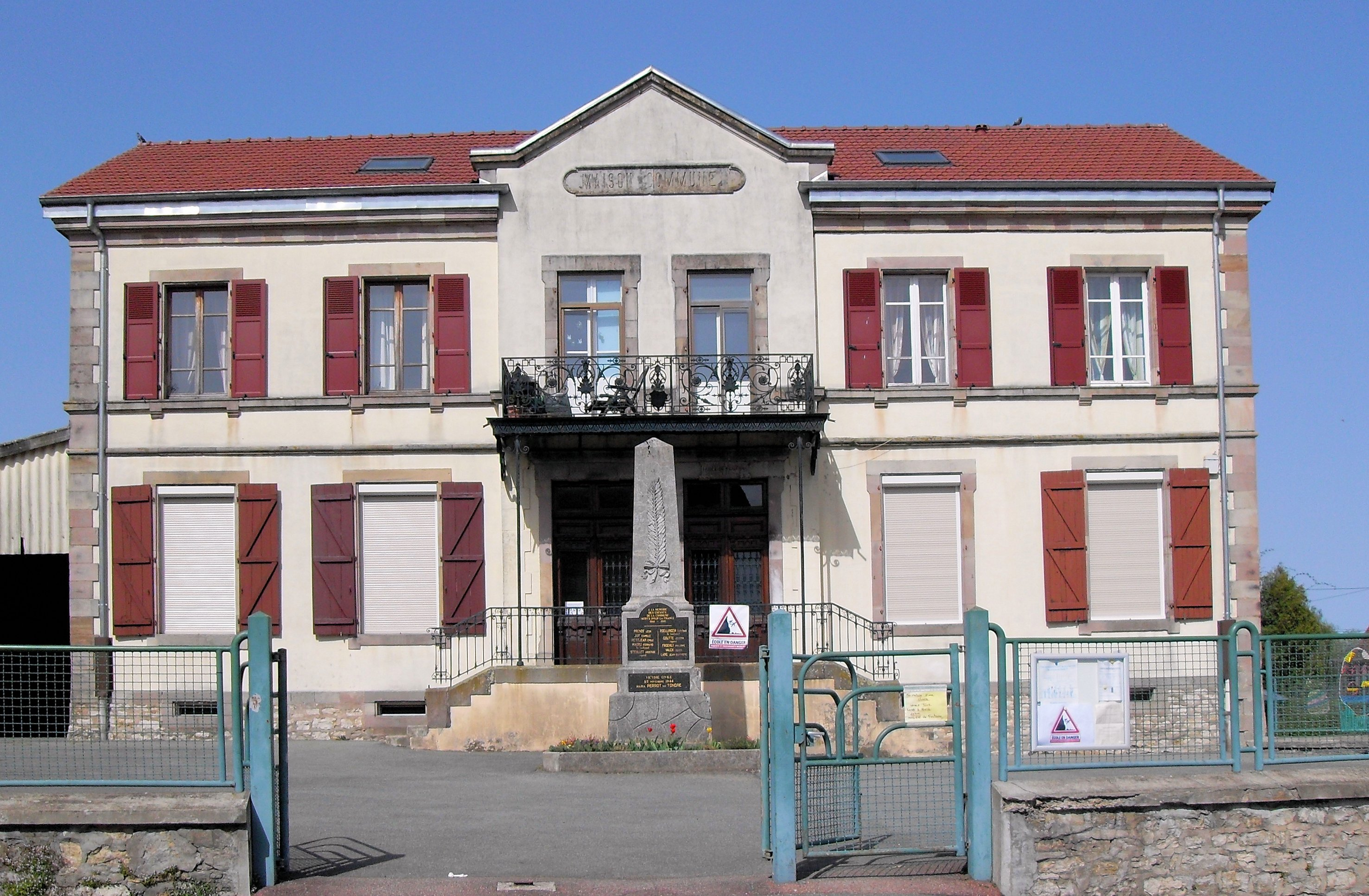
- Town hall-school
- Location of Angeot
- Location within France Location within Bourgogne-Franche-Comté
- Coordinates: 47°41′50″N 7°00′52″E
- Country: France
- Region: Bourgogne-Franche-Comté
- Department: Territoire de Belfort
- Arrondissement: Belfort
- Canton: Grandvillars
- Intercommunality: Grand Belfort

Government
  - Mayor (2020–2026): Michel Nardin
- Area^{1}: 6.56 km^{2} (2.53 sq mi)
- Highest elevation: 417 m (1,368 ft)
- Lowest elevation: 360 m (1,180 ft)
- Population (2023): 354
  - Density: 54.0/km^{2} (140/sq mi)
- Time zone: UTC+01:00 (CET)
  - Summer (DST): UTC+02:00 (CEST)
- INSEE/Postal code: 90002 /90150
- ^{1} French Land Register data, which excludes lakes, ponds, glaciers > 1 km^{2} (0.386 sq mi or 247 acres) and river estuaries.

Angeot (French pronunciation: [ɑ̃ʒo]) is a commune in the Territoire de Belfort department in Bourgogne-Franche-Comté in northeastern France.

== See also ==
- Communes of the Territoire de Belfort department
