= Vauthiermont =

- Commune
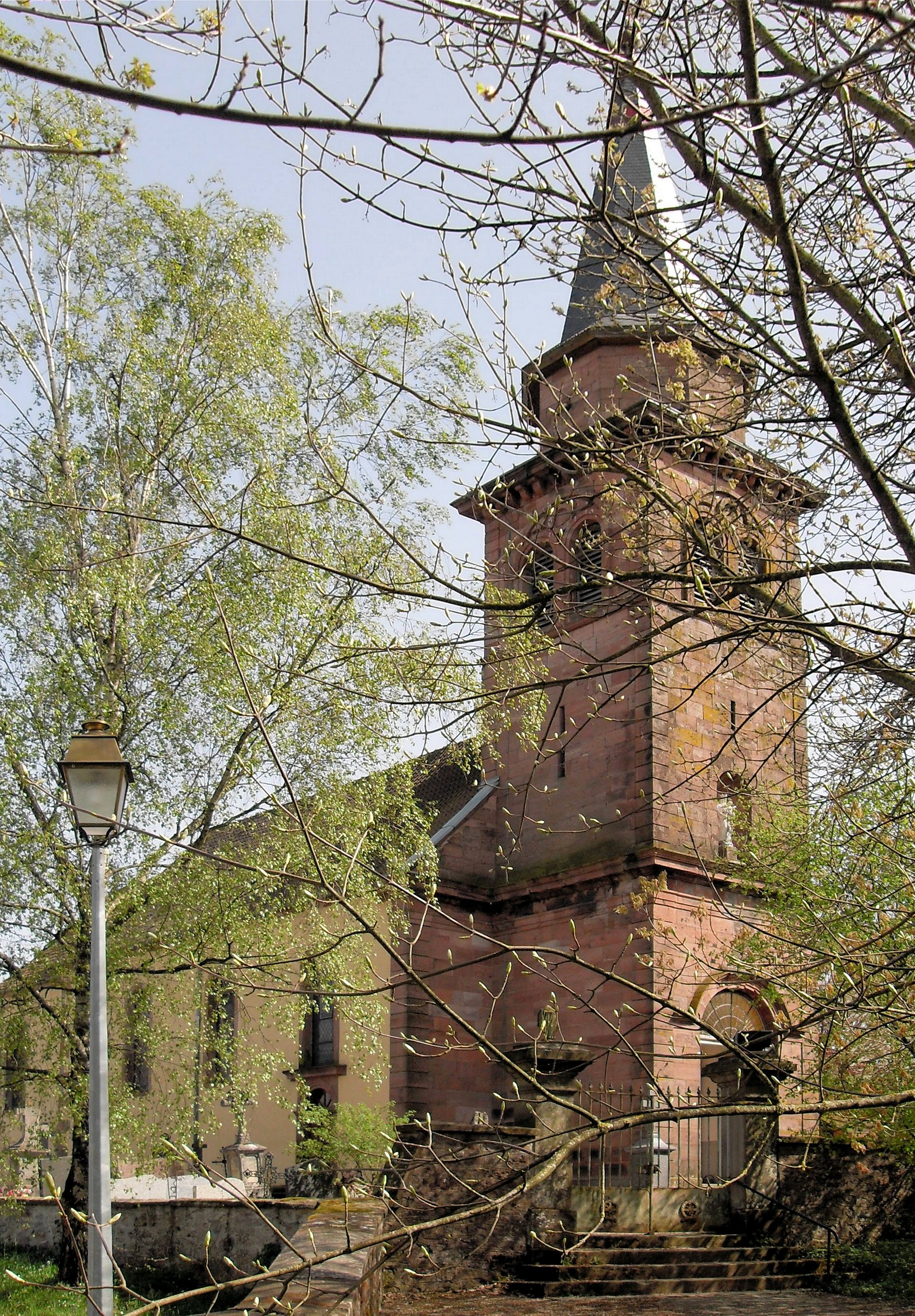
- The church of Saint-Antoine

- Coat of arms
- Location of Vauthiermont
- Location within France Location within Bourgogne-Franche-Comté
- Coordinates: 47°41′06″N 7°01′57″E
- Country: France
- Region: Bourgogne-Franche-Comté
- Department: Territoire de Belfort
- Arrondissement: Belfort
- Canton: Grandvillars
- Intercommunality: CA Grand Belfort

Government
  - Mayor (2020–2026): Alexandre Mancanet
- Area^{1}: 4.74 km^{2} (1.83 sq mi)
- Highest elevation: 412 m (1,352 ft)
- Lowest elevation: 354 m (1,161 ft)
- Population (2023): 232
  - Density: 48.9/km^{2} (127/sq mi)
- Time zone: UTC+01:00 (CET)
  - Summer (DST): UTC+02:00 (CEST)
- INSEE/Postal code: 90100 /90150
- ^{1} French Land Register data, which excludes lakes, ponds, glaciers > 1 km^{2} (0.386 sq mi or 247 acres) and river estuaries.

Vauthiermont (French pronunciation: [votjɛʁmɔ̃]) is a commune in the Territoire de Belfort department in Bourgogne-Franche-Comté in northeastern France.

== Geography ==
A part of the village is located on the line of watershed, between the Mediterranean sea and the North sea.

== See also ==
- Communes of the Territoire de Belfort department
