= Morvillars =

- Commune
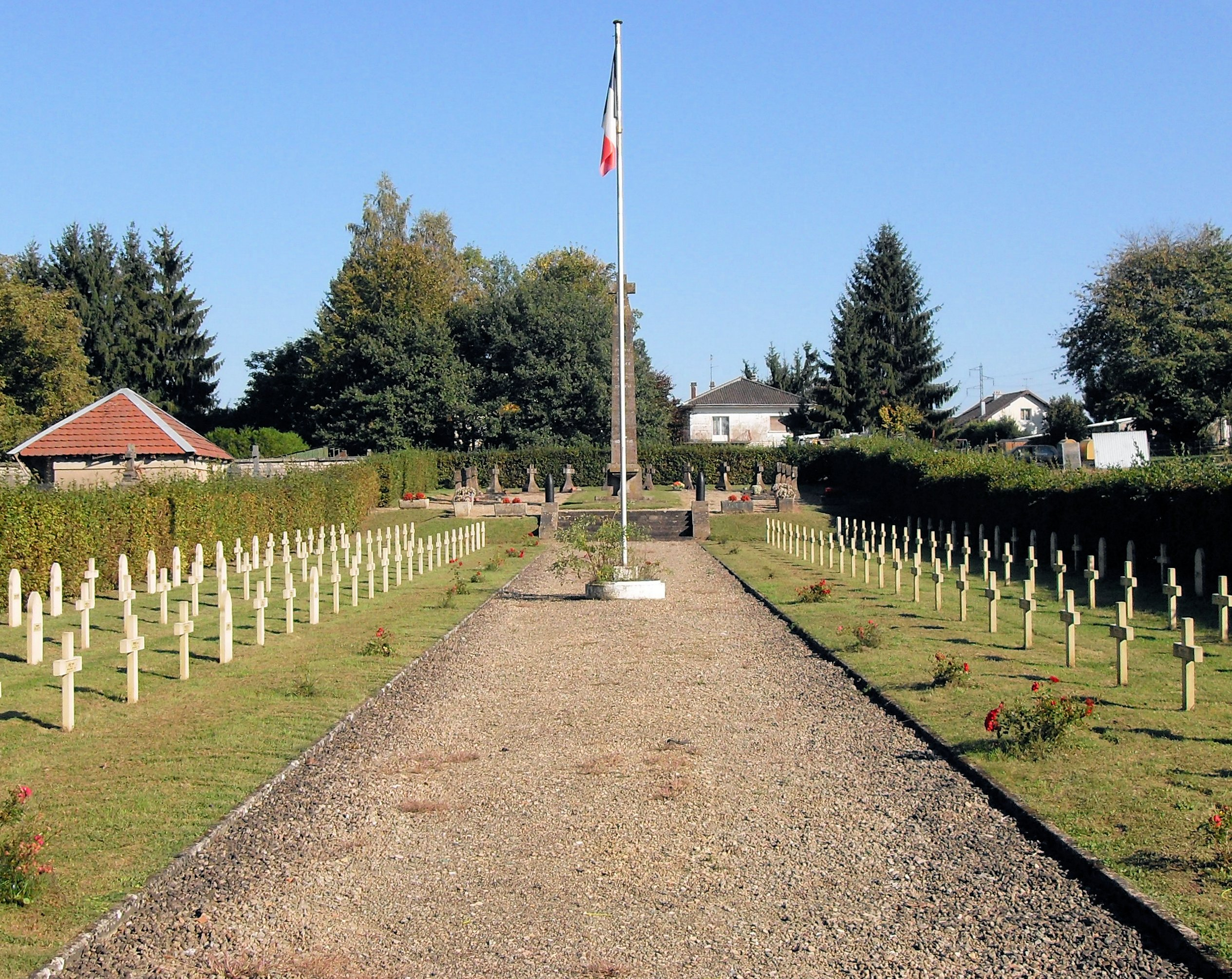
- World War I cemetery

- Coat of arms
- Location of Morvillars
- Location within France Location within Bourgogne-Franche-Comté
- Coordinates: 47°32′52″N 6°56′03″E
- Country: France
- Region: Bourgogne-Franche-Comté
- Department: Territoire de Belfort
- Arrondissement: Belfort
- Canton: Grandvillars
- Intercommunality: Grand Belfort

Government
  - Mayor (2020–2026): Françoise Ravey
- Area^{1}: 5.27 km^{2} (2.03 sq mi)
- Highest elevation: 403 m (1,322 ft)
- Lowest elevation: 330 m (1,080 ft)
- Population (2023): 1,113
  - Density: 211/km^{2} (547/sq mi)
- Time zone: UTC+01:00 (CET)
  - Summer (DST): UTC+02:00 (CEST)
- INSEE/Postal code: 90072 /90120
- ^{1} French Land Register data, which excludes lakes, ponds, glaciers > 1 km^{2} (0.386 sq mi or 247 acres) and river estuaries.

Morvillars (French pronunciation: [mɔʁvilaʁ]) is a commune in the Territoire de Belfort department in Bourgogne-Franche-Comté in northeastern France.

== See also ==
- Communes of the Territoire de Belfort department
