= Grandvillars =

- Commune
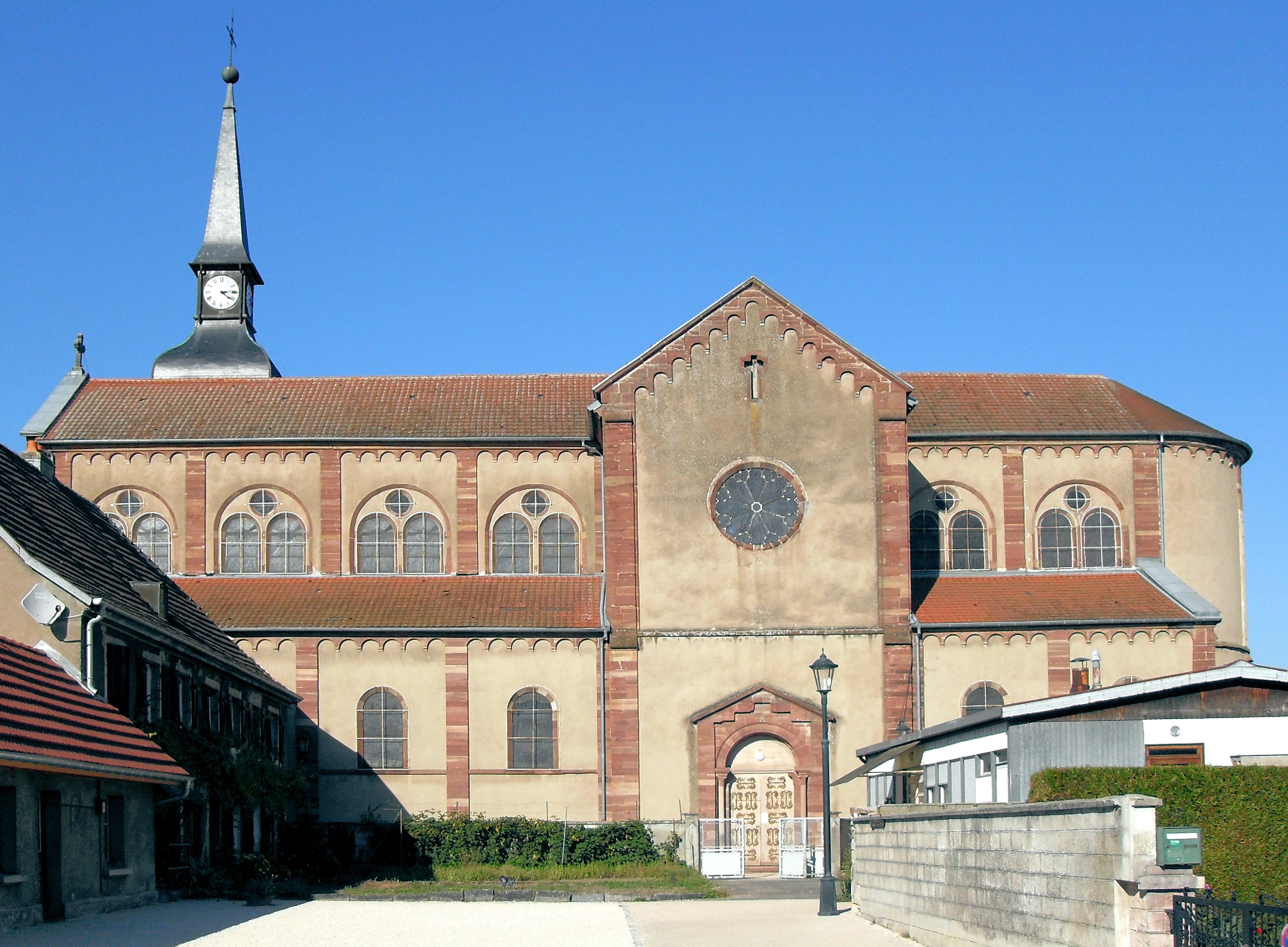
- Saint Martin Church

- Coat of arms
- Location of Grandvillars
- Location within France Location within Bourgogne-Franche-Comté
- Coordinates: 47°32′N 6°58′E
- Country: France
- Region: Bourgogne-Franche-Comté
- Department: Territoire de Belfort
- Arrondissement: Belfort
- Canton: Grandvillars
- Intercommunality: Sud Territoire

Government
  - Mayor (2020–2026): Christian Rayot
- Area^{1}: 15.17 km^{2} (5.86 sq mi)
- Highest elevation: 413 m (1,355 ft)
- Lowest elevation: 339 m (1,112 ft)
- Population (2023): 2,947
  - Density: 194.3/km^{2} (503.1/sq mi)
- Time zone: UTC+01:00 (CET)
  - Summer (DST): UTC+02:00 (CEST)
- INSEE/Postal code: 90053 /90600
- ^{1} French Land Register data, which excludes lakes, ponds, glaciers > 1 km^{2} (0.386 sq mi or 247 acres) and river estuaries.

Grandvillars (French pronunciation: [ɡʁɑ̃vilaʁ]) is a commune in the Territoire de Belfort department in Bourgogne-Franche-Comté in northeastern France.

== Population ==
Historical population
Year	Pop.	±% p.a.
1968	3,101	—
1975	3,231	+0.59%
1982	3,048	−0.83%
1990	2,874	−0.73%
1999	2,963	+0.34%
2007	3,139	+0.72%
2012	2,974	−1.07%
2017	2,974	+0.00%
2023	2,947	−0.15%
Source: INSEE

== See also ==
- Communes of the Territoire de Belfort department
