= Fontaine, Territoire de Belfort =

Fontaine
- Commune
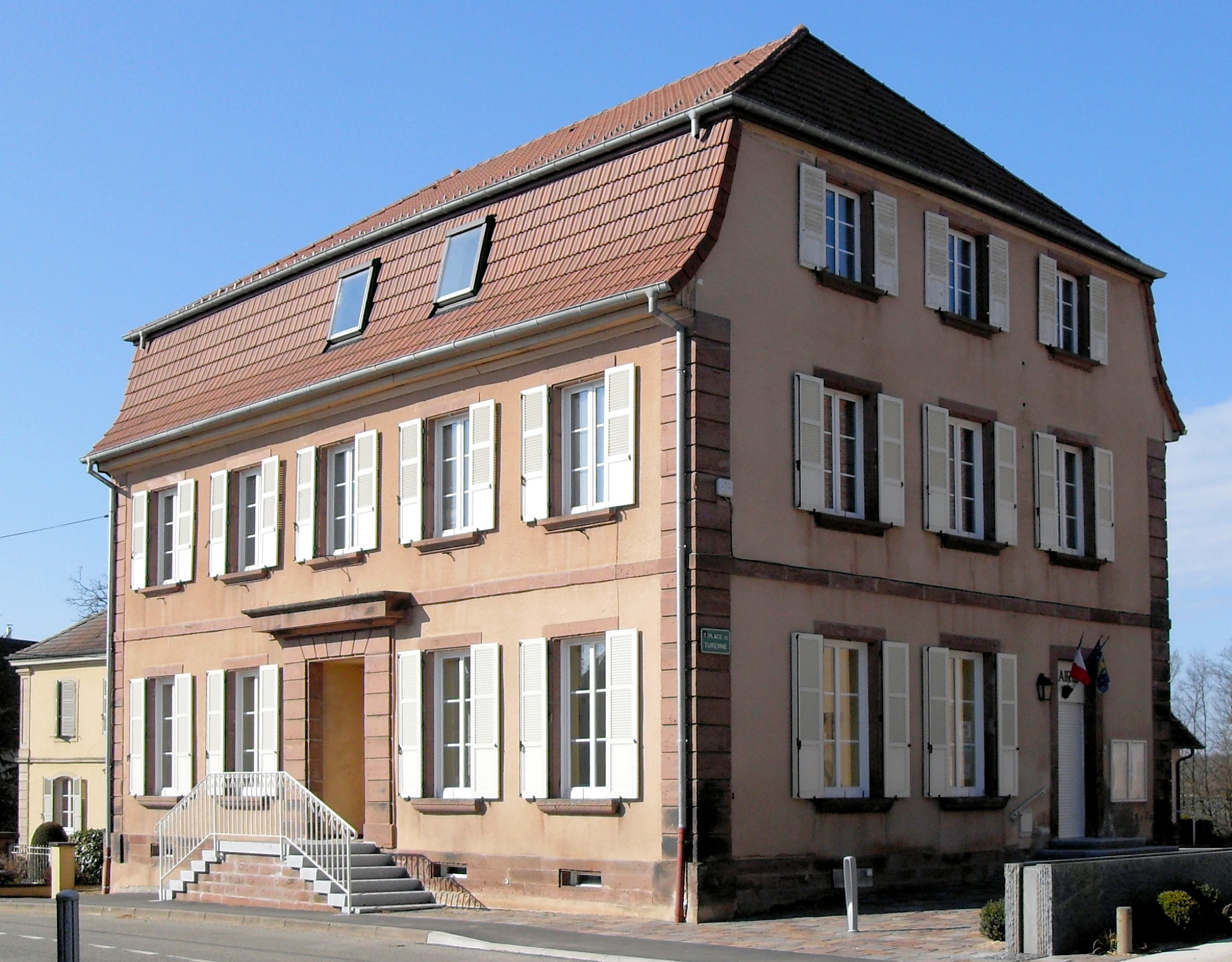
- The mairie

- Coat of arms
- Location of Fontaine
- Location within France Location within Bourgogne-Franche-Comté
- Coordinates: 47°39′37″N 6°59′59″E
- Country: France
- Region: Bourgogne-Franche-Comté
- Department: Territoire de Belfort
- Arrondissement: Belfort
- Canton: Grandvillars
- Intercommunality: Grand Belfort

Government
  - Mayor (2020–2026): Pierre Fietier
- Area^{1}: 6.96 km^{2} (2.69 sq mi)
- Highest elevation: 378 m (1,240 ft)
- Lowest elevation: 347 m (1,138 ft)
- Population (2023): 605
  - Density: 86.9/km^{2} (225/sq mi)
- Time zone: UTC+01:00 (CET)
  - Summer (DST): UTC+02:00 (CEST)
- INSEE/Postal code: 90047 /90150
- ^{1} French Land Register data, which excludes lakes, ponds, glaciers > 1 km^{2} (0.386 sq mi or 247 acres) and river estuaries.

Fontaine (French pronunciation: [fɔ̃tɛn]) is a commune in the Territoire de Belfort department, Bourgogne-Franche-Comté, northeastern France.

== See also ==
- Communes of the Territoire de Belfort department
