= Canton of Grandvillars =

Coordinates: 47.54°N 6.97°E

- Canton
- Situation of the canton of Grandvillars in the department of Territoire de Belfort
- Country: France
- Region: Bourgogne-Franche-Comté
- Department: Territoire de Belfort
- No. of communes: {{{nbcomm}}}
- Population (2023): 17,018
- INSEE code: 9008

The canton of Grandvillars is an administrative division of the Territoire de Belfort department, northeastern France. Its borders were modified at the French canton reorganisation which came into effect in March 2015. Its seat is in Grandvillars.

It consists of the following communes:

1. Angeot
2. Autrechêne
3. Bessoncourt
4. Bethonvilliers
5. Boron
6. Brebotte
7. Bretagne
8. Chavanatte
9. Chavannes-les-Grands
10. Cunelières
11. Eguenigue
12. Fontaine
13. Fontenelle
14. Foussemagne
15. Frais
16. Froidefontaine
17. Grandvillars
18. Grosne
19. Lacollonge
20. Lagrange
21. Larivière
22. Menoncourt
23. Méziré
24. Montreux-Château
25. Morvillars
26. Novillard
27. Petit-Croix
28. Phaffans
29. Recouvrance
30. Reppe
31. Suarce
32. Vauthiermont
33. Vellescot
