= Fontenelle, Territoire de Belfort =

Fontenelle
- Commune
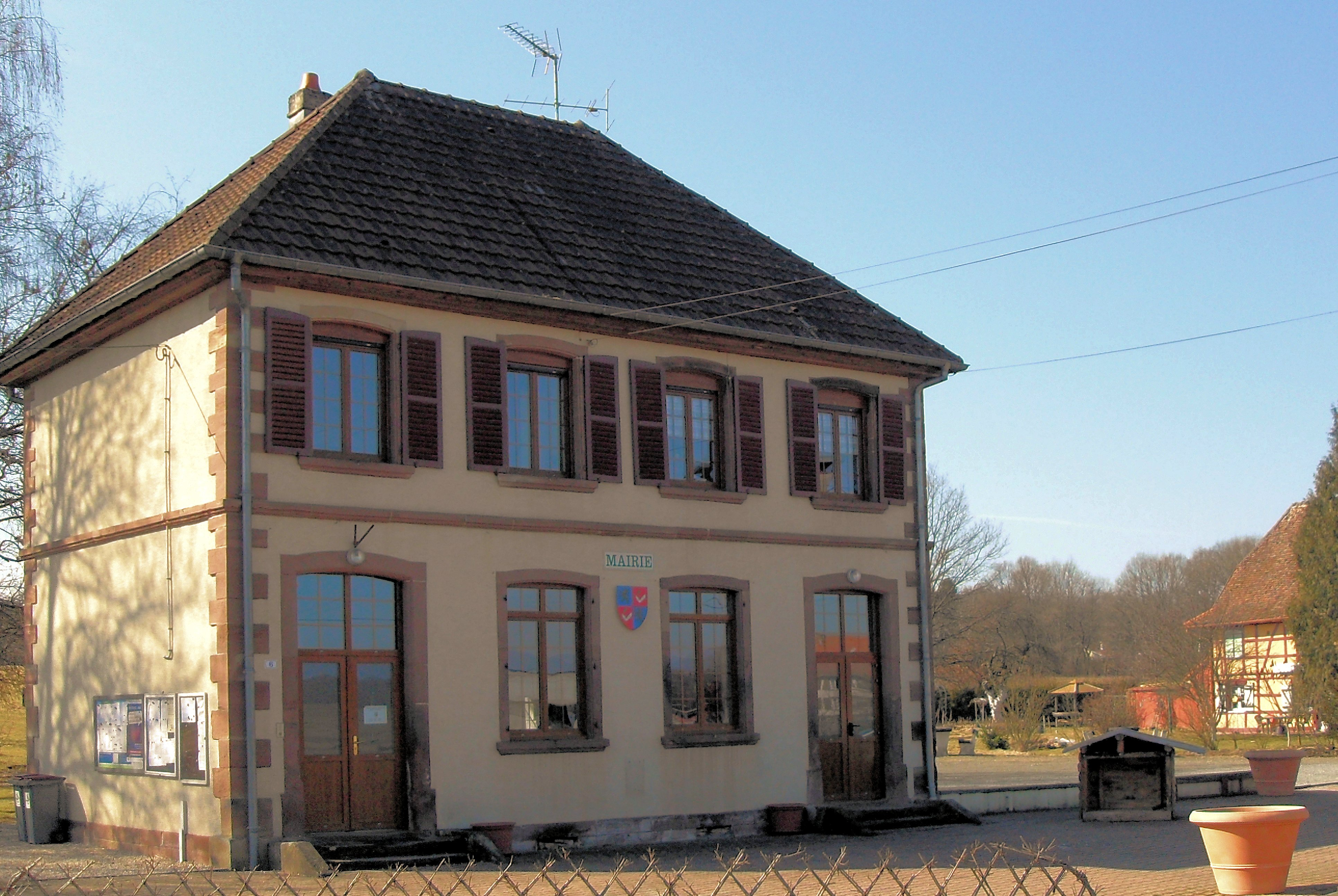
- Town hall and World War I memorial

- Coat of arms
- Location of Fontenelle
- Location within France Location within Bourgogne-Franche-Comté
- Coordinates: 47°37′21″N 6°57′25″E
- Country: France
- Region: Bourgogne-Franche-Comté
- Department: Territoire de Belfort
- Arrondissement: Belfort
- Canton: Grandvillars
- Intercommunality: Grand Belfort

Government
  - Mayor (2020–2026): Jean-Claude Mougin
- Area^{1}: 1.75 km^{2} (0.68 sq mi)
- Highest elevation: 369 m (1,211 ft)
- Lowest elevation: 338 m (1,109 ft)
- Population (2023): 135
  - Density: 77.1/km^{2} (200/sq mi)
- Time zone: UTC+01:00 (CET)
  - Summer (DST): UTC+02:00 (CEST)
- INSEE/Postal code: 90048 /90340
- ^{1} French Land Register data, which excludes lakes, ponds, glaciers > 1 km^{2} (0.386 sq mi or 247 acres) and river estuaries.

Fontenelle is a commune in the Territoire de Belfort department in Bourgogne-Franche-Comté in northeastern France.

== See also ==
- Communes of the Territoire de Belfort department
