= Boron, Territoire de Belfort =

Boron
- Commune
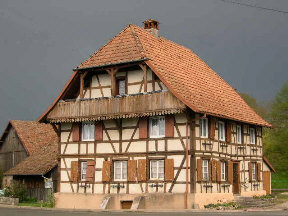
- Half-timbered house in Boron

- Coat of arms
- Location of Boron
- Location within France Location within Bourgogne-Franche-Comté
- Coordinates: 47°33′42″N 7°00′39″E
- Country: France
- Region: Bourgogne-Franche-Comté
- Department: Territoire de Belfort
- Arrondissement: Belfort
- Canton: Grandvillars
- Intercommunality: Sud Territoire

Government
  - Mayor (2020–2026): Dominique Tréla
- Area^{1}: 6.05 km^{2} (2.34 sq mi)
- Highest elevation: 397 m (1,302 ft)
- Lowest elevation: 360 m (1,180 ft)
- Population (2023): 484
  - Density: 80.0/km^{2} (207/sq mi)
- Time zone: UTC+01:00 (CET)
  - Summer (DST): UTC+02:00 (CEST)
- INSEE/Postal code: 90014 /90100
- ^{1} French Land Register data, which excludes lakes, ponds, glaciers > 1 km^{2} (0.386 sq mi or 247 acres) and river estuaries.

Boron (French pronunciation: [bɔʁɔ̃]) is a commune in the Territoire de Belfort department in Bourgogne-Franche-Comté in northeastern France.

== See also ==
- Communes of the Territoire de Belfort department
