= Bretagne, Territoire de Belfort =

Bretagne
- Commune
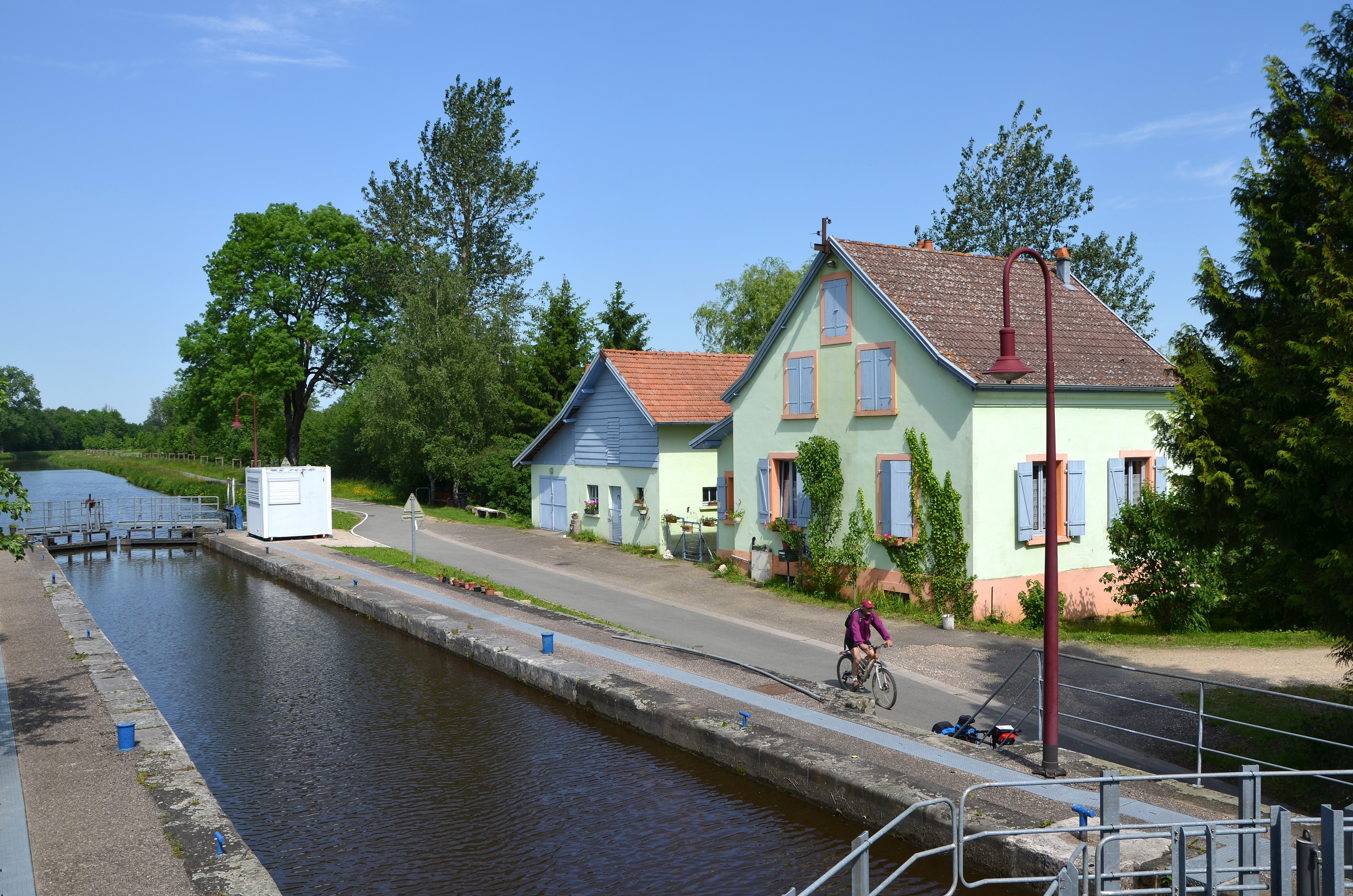
- Lock on the Rhone–Rhine Canal
- Location of Bretagne
- Location within France Location within Bourgogne-Franche-Comté
- Coordinates: 47°35′45″N 6°59′55″E
- Country: France
- Region: Bourgogne-Franche-Comté
- Department: Territoire de Belfort
- Arrondissement: Belfort
- Canton: Grandvillars
- Intercommunality: Sud Territoire

Government
  - Mayor (2020–2026): Vincent Freard
- Area^{1}: 4.67 km^{2} (1.80 sq mi)
- Highest elevation: 377 m (1,237 ft)
- Lowest elevation: 335 m (1,099 ft)
- Population (2023): 319
  - Density: 68.3/km^{2} (177/sq mi)
- Time zone: UTC+01:00 (CET)
  - Summer (DST): UTC+02:00 (CEST)
- INSEE/Postal code: 90019 /90130
- ^{1} French Land Register data, which excludes lakes, ponds, glaciers > 1 km^{2} (0.386 sq mi or 247 acres) and river estuaries.

Bretagne (French pronunciation: [bʁətaɲ]) is a commune in the Territoire de Belfort department in Bourgogne-Franche-Comté in northeastern France.

== See also ==
- Communes of the Territoire de Belfort department
