= Lacollonge =

- Commune
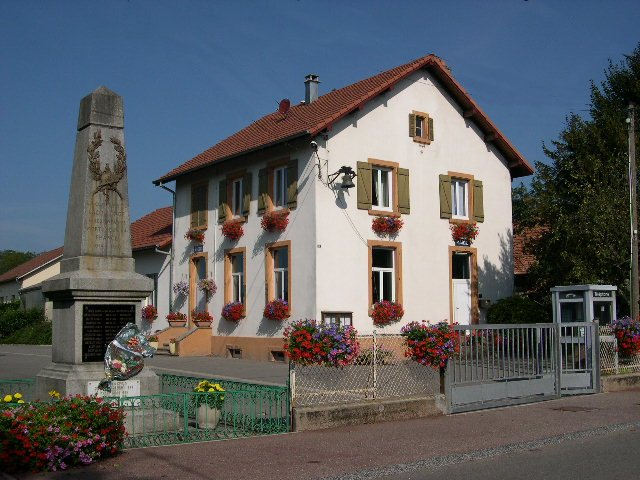
- Town hall and War memorial

- Coat of arms
- Location of Lacollonge
- Location within France Location within Bourgogne-Franche-Comté
- Coordinates: 47°39′52″N 6°57′38″E
- Country: France
- Region: Bourgogne-Franche-Comté
- Department: Territoire de Belfort
- Arrondissement: Belfort
- Canton: Grandvillars
- Intercommunality: CA Grand Belfort

Government
  - Mayor (2020–2026): Michel Blanc
- Area^{1}: 1.92 km^{2} (0.74 sq mi)
- Highest elevation: 381 m (1,250 ft)
- Lowest elevation: 354 m (1,161 ft)
- Population (2023): 234
  - Density: 122/km^{2} (316/sq mi)
- Time zone: UTC+01:00 (CET)
  - Summer (DST): UTC+02:00 (CEST)
- INSEE/Postal code: 90059 /90150
- ^{1} French Land Register data, which excludes lakes, ponds, glaciers > 1 km^{2} (0.386 sq mi or 247 acres) and river estuaries.

Lacollonge (French pronunciation: [lakɔlɔ̃ʒ]) is a commune in the Territoire de Belfort department in Bourgogne-Franche-Comté in northeastern France.

== See also ==
- Communes of the Territoire de Belfort department
