= Reppe, Territoire de Belfort =

Reppe
- Commune
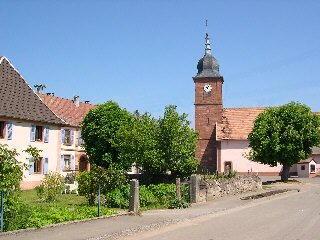
- The main street

- Coat of arms
- Location of Reppe
- Location within France Location within Bourgogne-Franche-Comté
- Coordinates: 47°39′42″N 7°01′34″E
- Country: France
- Region: Bourgogne-Franche-Comté
- Department: Territoire de Belfort
- Arrondissement: Belfort
- Canton: Grandvillars
- Intercommunality: CA Grand Belfort

Government
  - Mayor (2020–2026): Olivier Chretien
- Area^{1}: 3.88 km^{2} (1.50 sq mi)
- Highest elevation: 399 m (1,309 ft)
- Lowest elevation: 357 m (1,171 ft)
- Population (2023): 322
  - Density: 83.0/km^{2} (215/sq mi)
- Time zone: UTC+01:00 (CET)
  - Summer (DST): UTC+02:00 (CEST)
- INSEE/Postal code: 90084 /90150
- ^{1} French Land Register data, which excludes lakes, ponds, glaciers > 1 km^{2} (0.386 sq mi or 247 acres) and river estuaries.

Reppe (French pronunciation: [ʁɛp]) is a commune in the Territoire de Belfort department in Bourgogne-Franche-Comté in northeastern France.

== See also ==
- Communes of the Territoire de Belfort department
