= Novillard =

- Commune
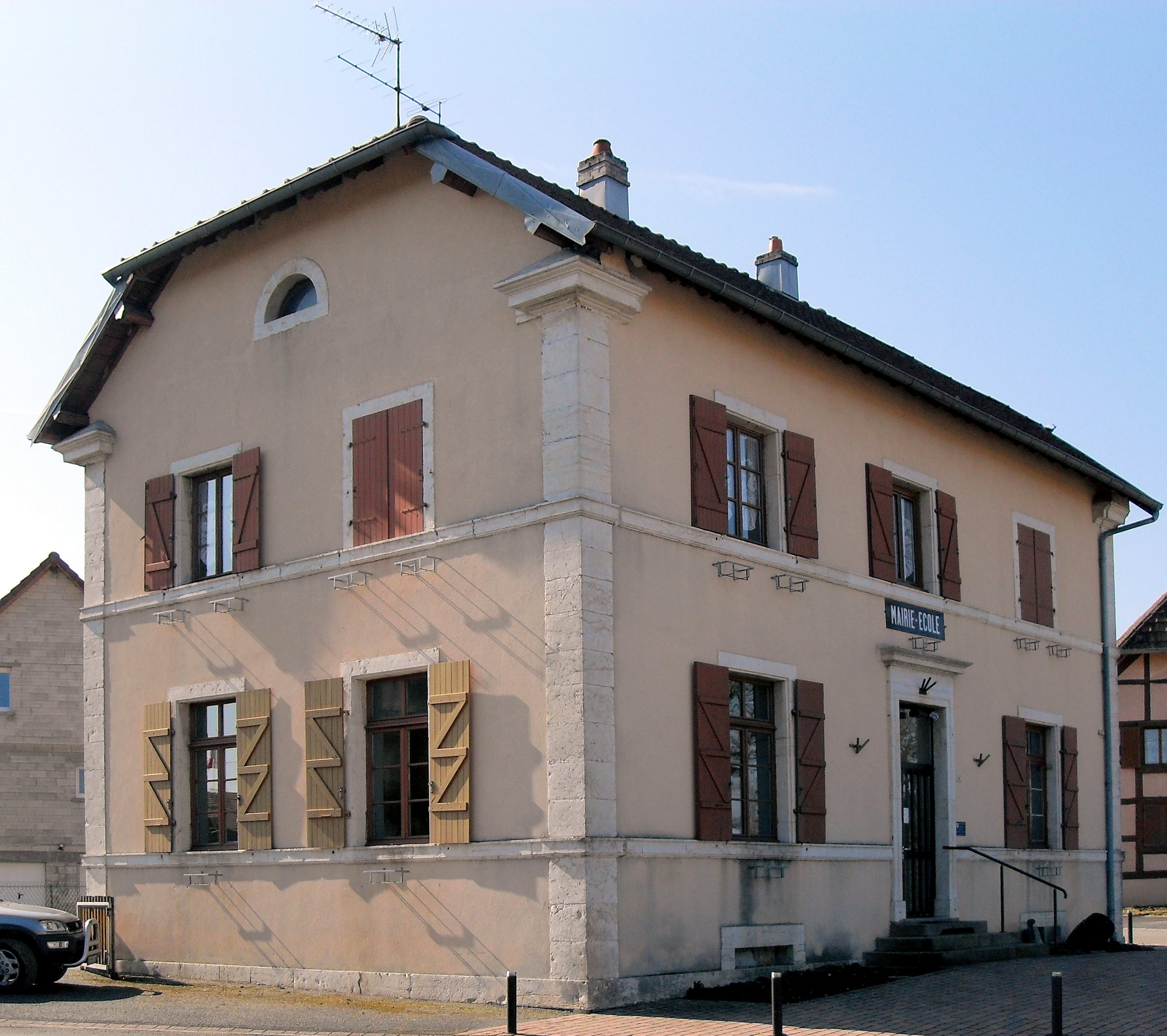
- Town hall

- Coat of arms
- Location of Novillard
- Location within France Location within Bourgogne-Franche-Comté
- Coordinates: 47°36′26″N 6°58′16″E
- Country: France
- Region: Bourgogne-Franche-Comté
- Department: Territoire de Belfort
- Arrondissement: Belfort
- Canton: Grandvillars
- Intercommunality: Grand Belfort

Government
  - Mayor (2020–2026): Pascale Gabilloux
- Area^{1}: 3.79 km^{2} (1.46 sq mi)
- Highest elevation: 371 m (1,217 ft)
- Lowest elevation: 335 m (1,099 ft)
- Population (2023): 300
  - Density: 79/km^{2} (210/sq mi)
- Time zone: UTC+01:00 (CET)
  - Summer (DST): UTC+02:00 (CEST)
- INSEE/Postal code: 90074 /90340
- ^{1} French Land Register data, which excludes lakes, ponds, glaciers > 1 km^{2} (0.386 sq mi or 247 acres) and river estuaries.

Novillard (French pronunciation: [nɔvilaʁ]; German: Neuweiler) is a commune in the Territoire de Belfort department in Bourgogne-Franche-Comté in northeastern France.

== Geography ==
=== Climate ===
Novillard has an oceanic climate (Köppen climate classification Cfb). The average annual temperature in Novillard is 10.7 °C (51.3 °F). The average annual rainfall is 909.2 mm (35.80 in) with December as the wettest month. The temperatures are highest on average in July, at around 19.8 °C (67.6 °F), and lowest in January, at around 2.1 °C (35.8 °F). The highest temperature ever recorded in Novillard was 38.0 °C (100.4 °F) on 4 August 2022; the coldest temperature ever recorded was −18.1 °C (−0.6 °F) on 20 December 2009.

Climate data for Novillard (1991−2020 normals, extremes 2009−present)
Month	Jan	Feb	Mar	Apr	May	Jun	Jul	Aug	Sep	Oct	Nov	Dec	Year
Record high °C (°F)	16.8 (62.2)	21.8 (71.2)	25.1 (77.2)	28.1 (82.6)	32.0 (89.6)	35.2 (95.4)	37.5 (99.5)	38.0 (100.4)	32.8 (91.0)	29.6 (85.3)	23.4 (74.1)	17.1 (62.8)	38.0 (100.4)
Mean daily maximum °C (°F)	4.8 (40.6)	6.4 (43.5)	11.5 (52.7)	16.5 (61.7)	19.4 (66.9)	23.8 (74.8)	26.3 (79.3)	25.9 (78.6)	21.6 (70.9)	15.5 (59.9)	9.8 (49.6)	6.3 (43.3)	15.7 (60.3)
Daily mean °C (°F)	2.1 (35.8)	2.8 (37.0)	6.5 (43.7)	10.5 (50.9)	13.7 (56.7)	17.9 (64.2)	19.8 (67.6)	19.4 (66.9)	15.6 (60.1)	10.9 (51.6)	6.4 (43.5)	3.1 (37.6)	10.7 (51.3)
Mean daily minimum °C (°F)	−0.6 (30.9)	−0.8 (30.6)	1.5 (34.7)	4.6 (40.3)	8.0 (46.4)	12.0 (53.6)	13.3 (55.9)	12.9 (55.2)	9.6 (49.3)	6.3 (43.3)	3.0 (37.4)	0.0 (32.0)	5.8 (42.4)
Record low °C (°F)	−12.1 (10.2)	−15.6 (3.9)	−7.7 (18.1)	−4.7 (23.5)	−2.3 (27.9)	4.4 (39.9)	5.1 (41.2)	3.8 (38.8)	1.5 (34.7)	−4.2 (24.4)	−11.0 (12.2)	−18.1 (−0.6)	−18.1 (−0.6)
Average precipitation mm (inches)	82.6 (3.25)	65.8 (2.59)	54.4 (2.14)	65.9 (2.59)	90.9 (3.58)	85.0 (3.35)	71.7 (2.82)	79.6 (3.13)	54.6 (2.15)	73.0 (2.87)	81.1 (3.19)	104.6 (4.12)	909.2 (35.80)
Average precipitation days (≥ 1.0 mm)	11.9	10.8	9.7	8.7	13.1	10.4	9.7	9.8	8.3	10.6	11.2	14.0	128.1
Source: Météo-France

== See also ==
- Communes of the Territoire de Belfort department
