= Grand Belfort =

- Communauté d'agglomération
- Location of Grand Belfort within the department
- Coordinates: 47°38′N 06°51′E
- Country: France
- Region: Bourgogne-Franche-Comté
- Department: Territoire de Belfort
- No. of communes: {{{nbcomm}}}
- Established: 1 January 2017

Government
  - President: Damien Meslot (LR)
- Area: 262.0 km^{2} (101.2 sq mi)
- Population (2017): 103,741
  - Density: 396.0/km^{2} (1,026/sq mi)
- Website: www.grandbelfort.fr

Communauté d'agglomération Grand Belfort is an intercommunal structure, centred on the city of Belfort. It is located in the Territoire de Belfort department, in the Bourgogne-Franche-Comté region, eastern France. It was created in January 2017. Its seat is in Belfort. Its area is 262.0 km^{2}. Its population was 103,741 in 2017, of which 47,656 in Belfort proper.

== Composition ==
The communauté d'agglomération consists of the following 52 communes:

1. Andelnans
2. Angeot
3. Argiésans
4. Autrechêne
5. Banvillars
6. Bavilliers
7. Belfort
8. Bermont
9. Bessoncourt
10. Bethonvilliers
11. Botans
12. Bourogne
13. Buc
14. Charmois
15. Châtenois-les-Forges
16. Chèvremont
17. Cravanche
18. Cunelières
19. Danjoutin
20. Denney
21. Dorans
22. Eguenigue
23. Éloie
24. Essert
25. Évette-Salbert
26. Fontaine
27. Fontenelle
28. Foussemagne
29. Frais
30. Lacollonge
31. Lagrange
32. Larivière
33. Menoncourt
34. Meroux-Moval
35. Méziré
36. Montreux-Château
37. Morvillars
38. Novillard
39. Offemont
40. Pérouse
41. Petit-Croix
42. Phaffans
43. Reppe
44. Roppe
45. Sermamagny
46. Sevenans
47. Trévenans
48. Urcerey
49. Valdoie
50. Vauthiermont
51. Vétrigne
52. Vézelois
