= Froidefontaine =

- Commune
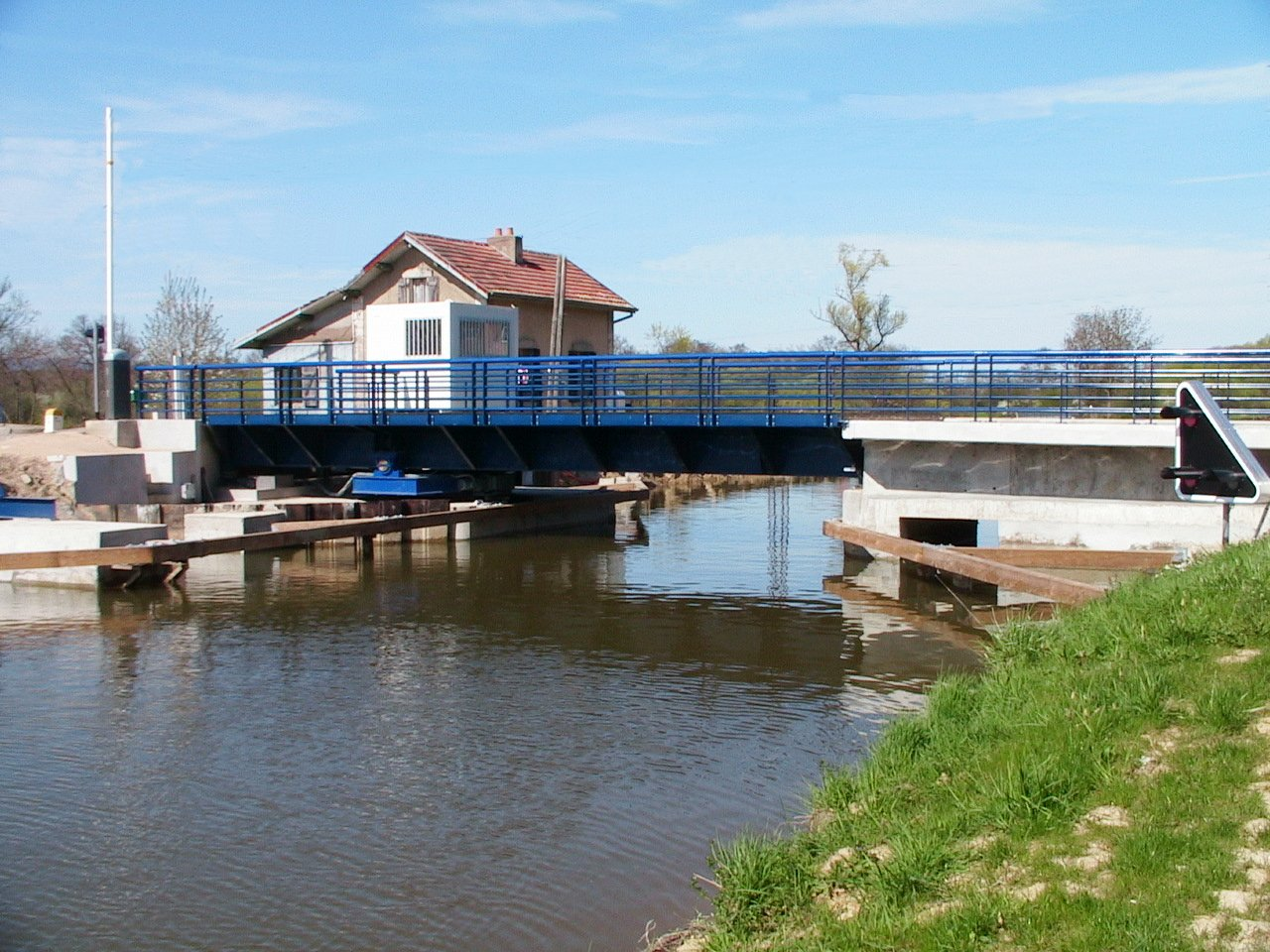
- Swing bridge on the Rhone–Rhine Canal

- Coat of arms
- Location of Froidefontaine
- Location within France Location within Bourgogne-Franche-Comté
- Coordinates: 47°33′57″N 6°56′53″E
- Country: France
- Region: Bourgogne-Franche-Comté
- Department: Territoire de Belfort
- Arrondissement: Belfort
- Canton: Grandvillars
- Intercommunality: Sud Territoire

Government
  - Mayor (2020–2026): Bernard Viatte
- Area^{1}: 4.55 km^{2} (1.76 sq mi)
- Highest elevation: 388 m (1,273 ft)
- Lowest elevation: 330 m (1,080 ft)
- Population (2023): 433
  - Density: 95.2/km^{2} (246/sq mi)
- Time zone: UTC+01:00 (CET)
  - Summer (DST): UTC+02:00 (CEST)
- INSEE/Postal code: 90051 /90140
- ^{1} French Land Register data, which excludes lakes, ponds, glaciers > 1 km^{2} (0.386 sq mi or 247 acres) and river estuaries.

Froidefontaine (French pronunciation: [fʁwadfɔ̃tɛn]) is a commune in the Territoire de Belfort department in Bourgogne-Franche-Comté in northeastern France.

== See also ==
- Communes of the Territoire de Belfort department
