= Bethonvilliers =

- Commune
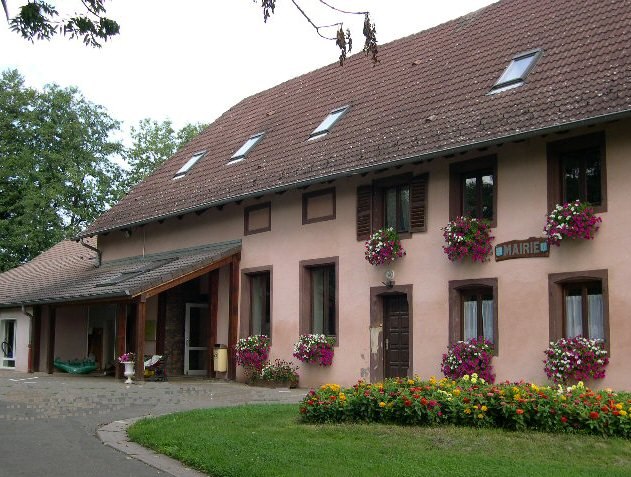
- The town hall of Bethonvilliers

- Coat of arms
- Location of Bethonvilliers
- Location within France Location within Bourgogne-Franche-Comté
- Coordinates: 47°40′52″N 6°57′46″E
- Country: France
- Region: Bourgogne-Franche-Comté
- Department: Territoire de Belfort
- Arrondissement: Belfort
- Canton: Grandvillars
- Intercommunality: Grand Belfort

Government
  - Mayor (2020–2026): Alain Tritter
- Area^{1}: 1.90 km^{2} (0.73 sq mi)
- Highest elevation: 407 m (1,335 ft)
- Lowest elevation: 365 m (1,198 ft)
- Population (2023): 232
  - Density: 122/km^{2} (316/sq mi)
- Time zone: UTC+01:00 (CET)
  - Summer (DST): UTC+02:00 (CEST)
- INSEE/Postal code: 90013 /90150
- ^{1} French Land Register data, which excludes lakes, ponds, glaciers > 1 km^{2} (0.386 sq mi or 247 acres) and river estuaries.

Bethonvilliers (French pronunciation: [bətɔ̃vilje]) is a commune in the Territoire de Belfort department in Bourgogne-Franche-Comté in northeastern France.

== See also ==
- Communes of the Territoire de Belfort department
