= Grosne =

- Commune
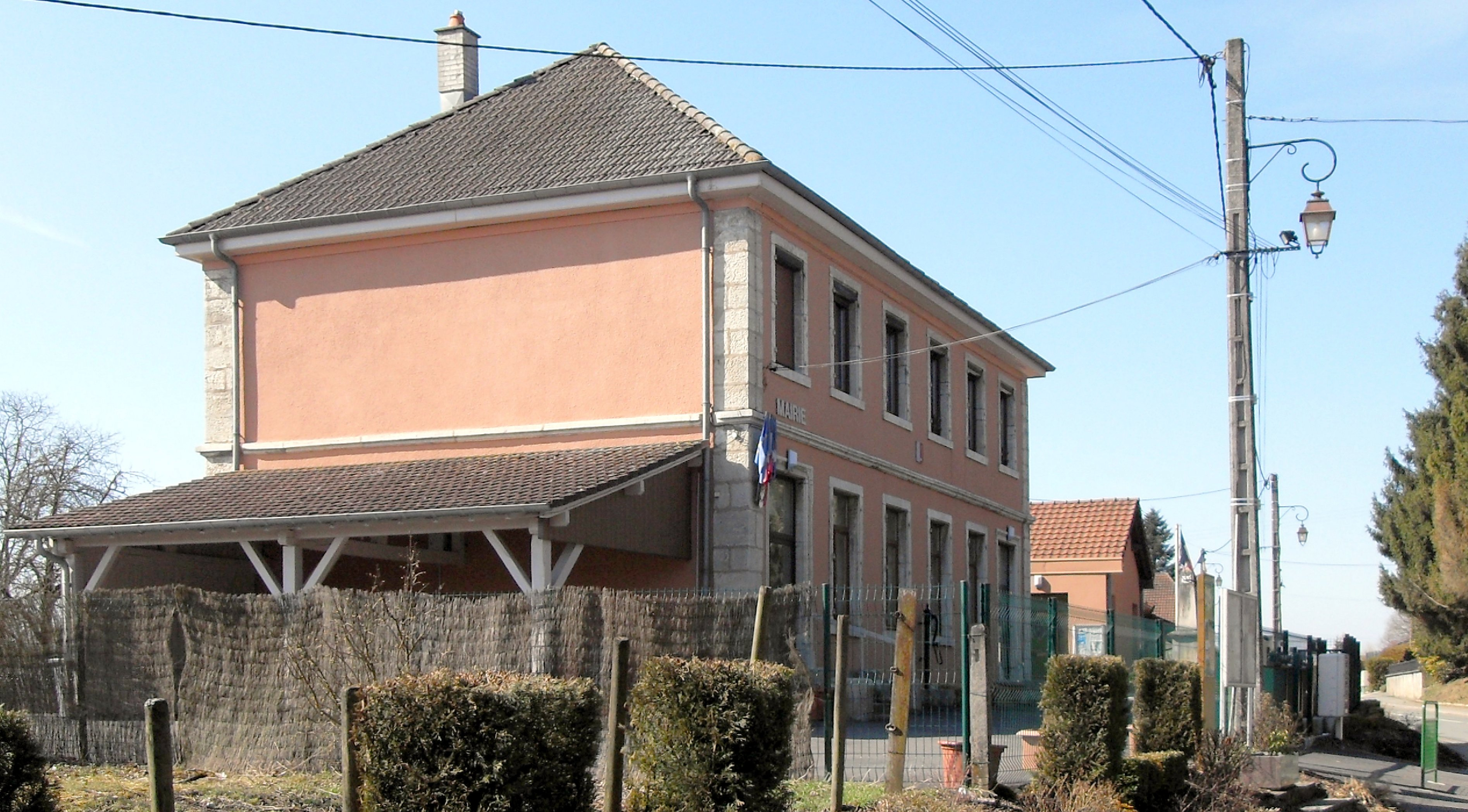
- Town hall

- Coat of arms
- Location of Grosne
- Location within France Location within Bourgogne-Franche-Comté
- Coordinates: 47°34′32″N 7°00′00″E
- Country: France
- Region: Bourgogne-Franche-Comté
- Department: Territoire de Belfort
- Arrondissement: Belfort
- Canton: Grandvillars
- Intercommunality: Sud Territoire

Government
  - Mayor (2020–2026): Jean-Louis Hottlet
- Area^{1}: 3.65 km^{2} (1.41 sq mi)
- Highest elevation: 388 m (1,273 ft)
- Lowest elevation: 345 m (1,132 ft)
- Population (2023): 321
  - Density: 87.9/km^{2} (228/sq mi)
- Time zone: UTC+01:00 (CET)
  - Summer (DST): UTC+02:00 (CEST)
- INSEE/Postal code: 90055 /90100
- ^{1} French Land Register data, which excludes lakes, ponds, glaciers > 1 km^{2} (0.386 sq mi or 247 acres) and river estuaries.

Grosne (French pronunciation: [ɡʁon]) is a commune in the Territoire de Belfort department in Bourgogne-Franche-Comté in northeastern France.

== See also ==
- Communes of the Territoire de Belfort department
