= List of German exonyms for places in France =

This is a list of German-language names for places in France.

== Complete list ==
France Frankreich
French place	German name	Notes
Abbeville	Abbegem	
Aboncourt	Endorf	
Aillevillers-et-Lyaumont	Andersweiler	
Aix-en-Provence	Wälsch-Aachen	
Albé	Erlenbach	
Allain	Alanen	
Allarmont	Allhartsberg	
Anglemont	Engelberg	
Anould	Alhausen	
Apt	Apte	
Alsace	Elsaß	
Altorf	Altdorf (bei Molsheim)	
Andelnans	Andelnach	
Angeot	Angreth	
Angeot	Engelsold	
Angeot	Ingelsod	
Anjoutey	Anschat(t)ingen	
Anjoutey	Anschide	
Archettes	Erzt	
Argiésans	Argsühne	
Argiésans	Archisau	
Argiésans	Reschans	
Arles	Arelat	
Arrentès-de-Corcieux	Arenz	
Audincourt	Andelach	
Audun-le-Roman	Aweduix	
Audun-le-Roman	Welsch-Oth	
Aumontzey	Amongsingen	
Autrechêne	Eichen	
Autrey	Altrich	
Auxelles-Bas	Nieder-Aßel	
Auxelles-Haut	Ober-Aßel	
Avignon	Avigon	
Avricourt	Ebertshofen	
Avricourt	Elfringen	
Aydoilles	Adollen	
Azannes-et-Soumazannes	Azingen	
Baccarat	Burgambach	
Badménil-aux-Bois	Badmenei	
Badonviller	Badenweiler	
Badonviller	Balzweiler	
Ban-de-Laveline	Owelingen	
Ban-de-Sapt	Bann	
Ban-sur-Meurthe	Bann an der Mörthe	
Banvillars	Ban(n)weiler	
Bar-le-Duc	Herzogenbar	
Barthelémont	Barthelburg	
Baume-les-Dames	Paamen	
Bavilliers	Nieder-Weiler	
Bayecourt	Bernhofen	
Beaucourt	Boocurt	
Beaucourt	Bubendorf	
Beauménil	Bomengen	
Beaumont	Bomunt	
Belfort	Beffert	
Belfort	Bergfried	Archaic
Belval	Balzweiler	
Bergues	Berg am Wynoxberg	
Bermont	Belmundt	
Bertimoutier	Wittkirch	
Besançon	Bisan(t)z	
Besançon	Wisantzun	
Bessoncourt	Bischingen	
Bessoncourt	Bissingen	
Bessoncourt	Büssignen	
Bethonvilliers	Bethweiler	
Bethonvilliers	Bettweiler	
Beurey-sur-Saulx	Bürich	
Beuvillers	Bockweiler	
Bezange-la-Grande	Großbessingen	
Bezaumont	Bezoldberg	
Blamont	Blankenberg	
Bleurville	Blederichshausen	
Boron	Bronnen	
Botans	Botland	
Boucq	Buch	
Bourogne	Böll	
Bourogne	Borignen	
Brebotte	Bruderbach	
Brebotte	Wirbot	
Bréhain-la-Ville	Bergheim	
Bretagne	Brett(en)	
Bretagne	Bretingen	
Briey	Brietz	
Bruyères	Brauers	
Bruyères	Brüchen	
Bruyères	Brühers	
Buc	Bück	
Buc	Birr	
Buissoncourt	Buschhofen	
Bulgneville	Bolchenhausen	
Burey-la-Côte	Borwick	
Bussang	Blitzbahn im Lothringnen	
Bussang	Büssingen	
Calais	Kalen	
Cambrai	Kamerich	
Cantebonne	Kantelborn	
Châlon-sur-Saône	Cawallen	
Châlonvillars	Kalonisberg	
Chambery	Kamrach	
Chambley-Bussieres	Schanble	
Champ-le-Duc	Herzogenkamp	
Charmois	Hagebuchen	
Charmois	Zarmweiler	
Charmois	Zarmwiller	
Charmois-devant-Bruyères	Zarmweiler	
Châtenois	Kestenholz	
Châtenois-les-Forges	Kestenhol(t)z	
Châtillon	Seig	
Chauvilliers	Kal(l)emberg	
Chaux	Tscha	
Chavanatte	Kleinschaffnat	
Chavannes-les-Grands	Großschaffnat	
Châtel-sur-Moselle	Moselburg	
Chèvremont	Geis(s)emberg	
Chèvremont	Ziegenberg	
Cirey-sur-Vezouze	Sigeringen	
Clefcy	Clause	
Colroy-la-Grande	Groß-Kolrein	
Commercy	Commarchen	
Contréxeville	Gundersweiler	
Corcieux	Goretzen	
Corcieux	Vi	
Cornimont	Hornenberg	
Courcelles	Kurzel(l)	
Courtelevant	He(r)bsdorf	
Couthenans	Kuttenach	
Cravanche	Cranwelsch	
Cravanche	Grauersch	
Cravanche	Gravetsch	
Cravanche	Rottweiler	
Crépey	Krippach	
Croix	Kreu(t)z	
Croix	Krütz	
Cunelières	Löffeldorf	
Damvillers	Dam(m)weiler	
Danjoutin	Damjustin	
Delle	Dattenreid	
Delle	Dettenreid	
Deneuvre	Domfer	
Denney	Dünningen	
Denney	Düringen	
Denney	Thiengen	
Deyvillers	Deyweiler	
Deyvillers	Gottesweiler	
Dieulouard	D(i)eul(e)wart	
Dignonville	Dingweiler	
Dijon	Dision	
Dijon	Tischau	
Docelles	Dossel	
Dogneville	Dodweiler	
Dole	Doll	
Dombasle-sur-Meurthe	Dombasel an der Mörthe	
Domèvre-sur-Durbion	Sankt Aper	
Domèvre-sur-Vezouze	Thumer	
Domrémy-la-Pucelle	Remshausen	
Dorans	Daurans	
Douai	Dauwey	
Dun-sur-Meuse	Daun	
Dunkerque	Dünkirchen	
Écurey-en-Verdunois	Scheurich	
Égletons	Adlerstadt	
Eguenigue	Eg(e)lingen	
Éloie	Alois	
Éloie	Lobe	
Einville-au-Jard	Eginweil	
Einville-au-Jard	Eisiedel	
Épinal	Spinneln	
Erbeviller-sur-Amezule	Erbenweiler	
Eschêne	Zureichen	
Essert	Scherb	
Essert	Schert	
Étain	Stain	
Étain	Stein	
Etobon	Elstaben	
Étueffont	Stauben	
Étueffont	Stauf(f)en	
Évette-Salbert	Weide(n)	
Évette-Salbert	Weites	
Évette-Salbert	Wette	
Fraize	Freß	
Fraize	Rudelingen	
Fraize	Sträthal	
Fraize	Streewthal	
Frapelle	Frobel	
Faucompierre	Falkenstein	
Faverois	Favernach	
Fêche-l'Église	Dorf ze Witz	
Fêche-l'Église	Fesch und Witz	
Felon	Fullon	
Felon	Vuolon	
Fenneviller	Vennweiler	
Fesches-le-Châtel	Vetsch	
Florimont	Blum(en)berg	
Fontaine	Brunn	
Fontenay	Finthen	
Fontenelle	Fontäne	
Fontenelle	Fontonel	
Foucheres-aux-Bois	Fonea	
Foug	Fug	
Foussemagne	Fiessenen	
Foussemagne	Fuchsmanien	
Foussemagne	Fuschsmeng	
Frais	Freß	
Frémeréville-sous-les-Côtes	Friemar	
Frémonville	Freimuntshausen	
Frémonville	Fremetingen	
Froidefontaine	Kaltenbrunn	
Frouard	Frowarden	
Gap	Wapingen	
Gemaingoutte	Gemeingut	
Gérardmer	Ger(har)dsee	
Gérardmer	Geroldsee	
Gerbéviller	Gerbweiler	
Gerbéviller	Gi(se)lbertsweiler	
Germiny	Grimmelshausen	
Girecourt-sur-Durbion	Scherhofen	
Girmont	Göricksberg	
Giromagny	Geudach	
Giromagny	Schermenei	
Giromagny	Schiromien	
Glère	Gliers	
Gondrecourt-le-Château	Guntershofen	
Gondreville	Gundolfsdorf	
Gondreville	Gundolfsweiler	
Gondreville	Gundolvesdorf	
Gondreville	Guntershausen	
Grandvillars	Gran(d)weiler	
Granges-sur-Velogne	Grensch	
Gray	Grey	
Grenoble	Granspel	
Grenoble	Graswalde	
Grosmagny	Großmenglatt	
Grosne	Welschegrün(e)	
Goussaincourt	Gozolfeshofen	
Halloville	Haileweiler	
Hargeville-sur-Chée	Hargenheim	
Haussonville	Hassenweiler	
Hénaménil	Hunaldsweiler	
Hennemont	Henneberg	
Hérimoncourt	Herimenhofen	
Herserange	Herseringen	
Hurbache	Harbach	
Hussigny-Godbrange	Hussingen-Godbringen	
Igney	Ellingen	
Jarville-la-Mangrange	Malgrangen	
Jeuxey	Gösach	
Joncherey	Grentschenach	
Joncherey	Guntscherach	
La Baffe	Baff	
La Bresse	Woll	
La Croix-aux-Mines	Heiligenkreuz	
Lachapelle-sous-Chaux	Kappeltscha	
Lachapelle-sous-Rougemont	Welschenkappel	
Lacollonge	Collonsche	
Lacollonge	Siedlung	
Lagrange	Scheuern	
Lagrange	Schüre	
Lamadeleine-Val-des-Anges	Magdalen im Engelsthal	
Lamadeleine-Val-des-Anges	Sankt Magdalen im Engental	
Langres	Lengerun	
Larivière	Fluß	
Larivière	Rifer	
Larivière	Rifir	
Lavine-devant-Bruyères	Ouwelingen bei Brauers	
Lavine-du-Houx	Ouwelingen	
Laxou	Lachsau	
Le Quesnoy	Eichicht	
Le Val-de-Saint-Dizier	Sankt Störgen im Tal	
Le Valtin	Mortz	
Le Valtin	Waldeck	
Lebetain	Lieb(en)thal	
Lepuix	Brunnen	
Lepuix	Soden	
Lepuix-Neuf	Soda	
Lepuix-Neuf	Sodt	
Lepuix-Neuf	Sood	
Leval	Das Tal	
Leval	Imtal	
Leval	Thal	
Liézey	Lizeis	
Ligny-en-Barrois	Lingen	
Lille	Reißel	
Limoges	Lünheim	
Liverdun	Leuwarden	
Liverdun	Liverden	
Longchamp	Langenkamp	
Longlaville	Longsdorf	
Longuyon	Langwien	
Longuyon	Long(w)ion	
Longwy	Langich	
Longwy	Longwich	
Lons-le-Saunier	Lon	
Lons-le-Saunier	Salzburg	
Lubine	Loubingen	
Lunéville	Lien(hard)stadt	
Lunéville	Lundsweiler	
Lunéville	Lü(e)nstädt(en)	
Lunéville	Lün(en)stadt	
Lure	Lüder(sdorf)	
Luxeuil-les-Bains	Luseul	
Lyon	Leyden	
Lyon	Wälsch-Leyden	
Leiden		
Wälsch-Leiden		
Mâcon	Metzschen	
Maîche	Metsch	
Malzeville	Malzeburg	
Malzeville	Malzheim	
Manheulles	Mannhüll	
Manoncourt-en-Vermois	Mannoshofen	
Marbache	Marbach	
Marbotte	Marbodsbrunn	
Marseille	Massilien	
Marville	Marweiler	
Maubeuge	Malbode	
Maxeville	Maxeburg	
Maxeville	Maxstadt	
Menoncourt	M(e)iningen	
Menoncourt	Mimingen	
Meroux	Mörlingen	
Meroux	Murg	
Méziré	Miserach	
Mirecourt	Meierhaf	
Mirecourt	Meierhofen	
Mirecourt	Mirgard	
Mont-Saint-Martin	Mertzberg	
Montbéliard	Mömpelgard	
Montbouton	Munpetun	
Montiers-sur-Saulx	Salzberg	
Montigny-lès-Metz	Monteningen	
Montjoie-le-Château	Frohberg	
Montmédy	Medinberg	
Montmédy	Mittelberg	
Montreux-Château	Burgmünsterol	
Montreux-Château	Münsterol die Berg	
Montreux-Château	Munstroll	
Mortagne	Mortingen	
Morvillars	Morsweiler	
Morvillars	Welsch-Motschwiller	
Morvillars	Welsch-Morswiller	
Morvillars	Welsch-Morzweiler	
Morville	Moorweiler	
Moussey	Mußey	
Moval	Zierlichthal	
Moyenmoutier	Mittelmünster	
Mulhouse	Mülhausen im Elsaß	
Nancy	Nanzig	
Neufchâteau	Neuenberg	
Neuvillers-sur-Fave	Neuweiler	
Nice	Nizza	
Novillard	Neuweiler	
Novillard	Neuwiller	
Offemont	Off(e)mundt	
Offemont	Offendorf	
Olley	Urbich	
Orange	Orense	
Pallegney	Pallignen	
Pérouse	Pfeffershausen	
Pérouse	Pfettershausen	
Pérouse	Pheterhusen	
Petit-Croix	Klein-Kreuz	
Petitefontaine	Brünn	
Petitefontaine	Kleinbrunn	
Petitmagny	Kleinmenglatt	
Phaffans	Pfeffingen	
Pierre-Percée	Langstein	
Pierrepont	Steinbrück	
Plainfang	Blenfingen	
Plainfang	Plempfey	
Plancher-les-Mines	Plänndtschier	
Plombières	Plombersbad	
Plombières	Plumben	
Plombières-les-Bains	Pflummern	
Plombières-les-Bains	Plumbers	
Plombières-les-Bains	Plummers	
Plombières-les-Bains	Plumserbad	
Pompierre	Steinbrücke	
Pont-a-Mousson	Moselbruck	
Pont-a-Mousson	Mussenbrück	
Pontarlier	Bünterlin	
Provenchères-sur-Fave	Brovotzer	
Provenchères-sur-Fave	Pfiffers	
Rambervillers	Ram(berts)weiler	
Rambervillers	Rappersweil(er)	
Raon-l'Etape	Raon am Zoll	
Raon-l'Etape	Rauwon (an der Mörthe)	
Raon-lès-Leau	Renenisbach	
Raon-lès-Leau	Renenispach	
Raon-sur-Plaine	Raon an der Plehn	
Raynans	Renach	
Réchésy	Röschlach	
Réchésy	Röschli(tz)	
Réchésy	Röschtitz	
Réchicourt-la-Petite	Kleinrixingen	
Recouvrance	Ruggenfrans	
Remiremont	Reimersberg	
Remiremont	Romberg	
Remiremont	Römerberg	
Remiremont	Rum(mels)berg	
Reppe	Riesbach	
Reppe	Rispach	
Reppe	Ropach	
Riervescemont	Hinterweßenberg	
Riervescemont	Oberweßenberg	
Romagny-sous-Rougemont	Welschenesch	
Romagny-sous-Rougemont	Welschennest	
Roppe	Roppach	
Roppe	Rotbach	
Rougegoutte	Rothfallen	
Rougegoutte	Rusengut	
Rougemont-le-Château	Rotenberg	
Rosières-en-Haye	Rosenhag	
Saint-Claude	Sankt Klaus	
Saint-Dié-des-Vosges	Diedrichsdorf	
Saint-Dié-des-Vosges	Diest	
Saint-Dié-des-Vosges	Sankt-Didel	
Saint-Dizier-l'Évêque	Ober Sankt-Störgen	
Saint-Dizier-l'Évêque	Sankt-Störgen	
Saint-Étienne-lès-Remiremont	Sankt-Stefan bei Romberg	
Saint-Germain-le-Châtelet	Sankt German	
Saint-Germain-le-Châtelet	Sank Hermannburg	
Saint-Leonard	Sankt-Lenhard	
Saint-Max	Sankt-Max	
Saint-Maurice-sur-Montagne	Sankt-Moritz	
Saint-Maurice-sur-Moselle	Sankt-Mortiz	
Saint-Michel-sur-Meurthe	Sankt-Michel an der Mörthe	
Saint-Nicolas-de-Port		
Saint-Nicolas-de-Port	(Sankt) Nikolausberg	
Saulcy-sur-Meurthe	Salzach an der Mörthe	
Saulnes	Sonne	
Saulxures-les-Moselotte	Holenbach	
Saulxures-les-Moselotte	Sashün im Lothringen	
Saulxures-les-Moselotte	Sassier	
Saulxures-les-Moselotte	Salzern	
Saulxures-les-Nancy	Salzern bei Nanzig	
Senones	Salm	
Senones	Sens	
Sermamagny	Semermeigen	
Sermamagny	Sermegin	
Sevenans	Schefferantz	
Sevenans	Zweinach	
Soulce	Sulz	
Spincourt	Spinnhofen	
Stainville	Steinhausen	
Stenay	Steinach	
Stenay	Steinheim	
Strasbourg	Straßburg	
Suarce	Schwer(t)z	
Thanvillé	Thannweiler	
Thaon-les-Vosges	Daun	
Thaon-les-Vosges	Tawon	
Thaon-les-Vosges	Thalfang im Wasgenwald	
Thiancourt	Durlingsdorf	
Thiancourt	Thecurt	
Thil	Thiel	
Thionville	Diedenhofen	
Tiercelet	Deutsch-Laer	
Tiercelet	Laar	
Tiercelet	Lahr	
Tomblaine	Tomblain	
Trétudans	Troste(l)ing(en)	
Trévenans	Trestudens	
Tronville-en-Barrois	Trudenheim	
Troyon	Tronje	
Toul	Leuk	
Toul	Toll	
Toul	T(h)ull	
Toulon	Telon	
Urcerey	Ruthbar	
Ussel	Oberstadt	
Valdieu-Luttran	Gottesthal-Luttan	
Valdoie	Wedau	
Valdoie	Wedaw	
Vagney	Wackenthal	
Valence	Valenz	
Valenciennes	Schwanenthal	
Vandœuvre-lès-Nancy	Vandover	
Varangéville	Warnegasthausen	
Varennes-en-Argonne	Wöringen	
Vaucouleurs	Farbenthal	
Vaudémont	Waldenberg	
Vaudéville	Worthenweiler	
Vauthiermont	Walt(h)ersberg	
Vauxvillers	Waldweiler	
Vaxencourt	Wackenhofen	
Ventron	Winterung	
Verdun	Verden an der Maas	
Verdun	Virten	
Verdun	Wehrdun	
Verdun	Wirten	
Vescemont	Ha(h)n(en)dorf	
Vesoul	Wesul	
Vétrigne	Würt(e)ringen	
Vézelois	Wieswald	
Vienne	Wälsch-Wien	
Vieux-Ferrette	Alt Pfirt	
Vieux-Thann	Alt Thann	
Vigneulles-lès-Hattonchâtel	Hattenburg	
Village-Neuf	Neudorf bei Hüningen	
Villars-le-Sec	Weiler	
Villé	Weiler	
Villeneuve	Neudorf	
Villers-le-Montagne	Bergweiler	
Villers-les-Nancy	Nanzigberg	
Villers-les-Nancy	Weiler bei Nanzig	
Villerupt	Weiler	
Villersexel	Sechsweiler	
Villey-le-Sec	Widilach	
Villoncourt	Willhofen	
Void-Vacon	Waid	
Vosges	Vogesen	
Vosges	Wasgau	
Vourvenans	Verbenen	
Wadonville-en-Woëvre	Wodenhausen	
Watronville	Wieterheim	
Werentzhouse	Werenzhausen	
Westhoffen	Westhofen	
Westhouse	Westhausen	
Westhouse-lès-Marmoutier	Westhausen bei Maursmünster	
Wickerschwihr	Wickerschweier	
Wihr-au-Val	Weier im Tal	
Wihr-en-Plaine	Weier (bei Colmar)	
Wintershouse	Wintershausen	
Wisches	Wisch	
Wisembach	Wiesenbach	
Wissembourg	Weißenburg	
Woël	Wuhl	
Wœrth	Wörth	
Woinville	Wydenheim	
Xonrupt-Longmemer	Siebach am Langsee	
Xousse	Sulz(e)	
Zaessingue	Zässingen	
Zinncourt	Sinnhofen	
