= Felon (disambiguation) =

A felon is someone who has committed a felony.

Felon may also refer to:

- Felon (film), a 2008 drama film starring Val Kilmer
- Whitlow (infection), an infection at the end of the finger
- Felon, Territoire de Belfort, a commune of the Franche-Comté region, in France
- Felon, NATO reporting name for the Sukhoi Su-57 jet fighter
