= Xavier Nady =

American baseball player (born 1978)

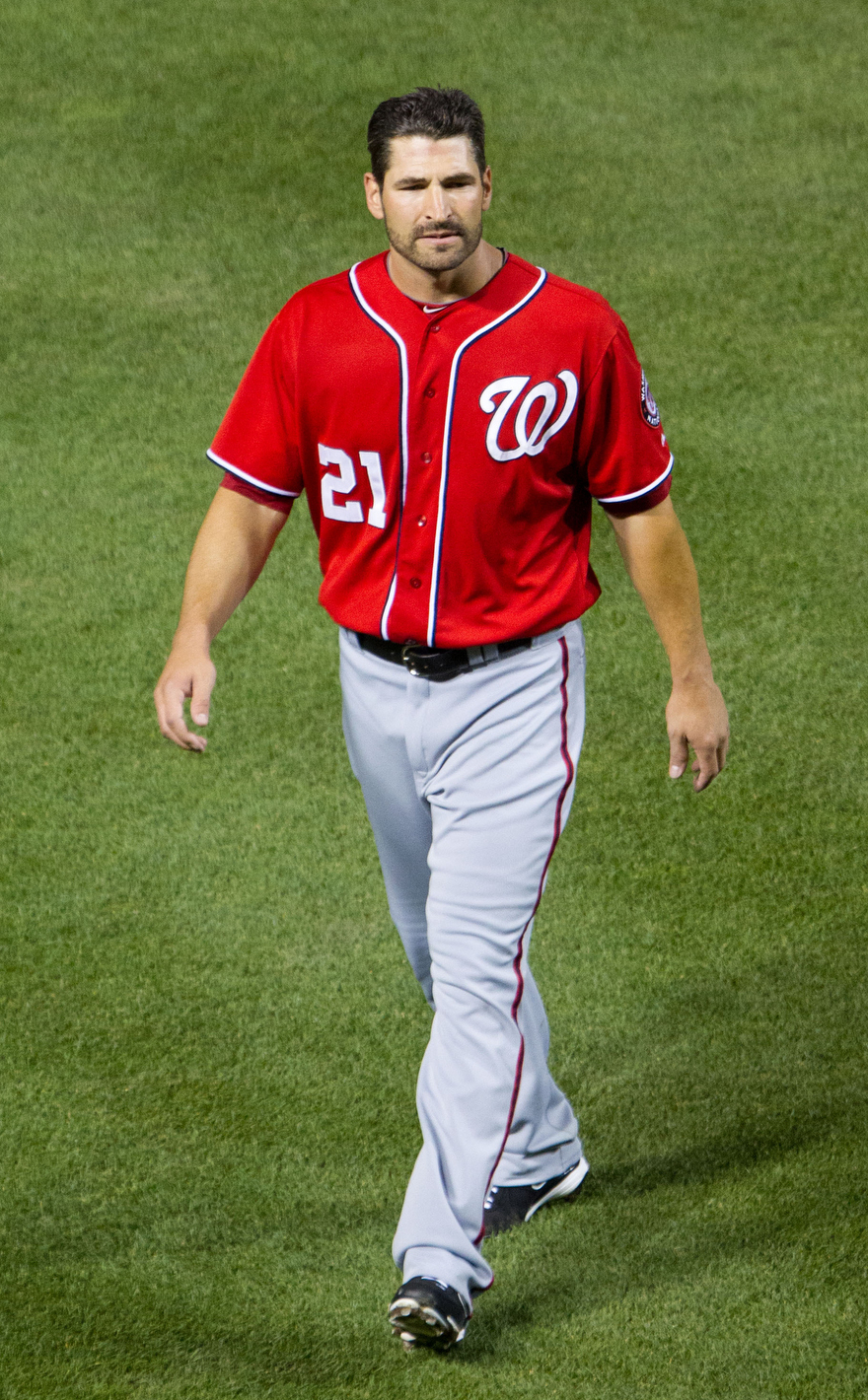
- Nady with the Washington Nationals
- Outfielder / First baseman
- Born: November 14, 1978 (age 48); Salinas, California, U.S.
- Batted: Right Threw: Right

MLB debut
- September 30, 2000, for the San Diego Padres

Last MLB appearance
- May 4, 2014, for the San Diego Padres

MLB statistics
- Batting average: .268
- Home runs: 104
- Runs batted in: 410
- Stats at Baseball Reference

Teams
- San Diego Padres (2000, 2003–2005); New York Mets (2006); Pittsburgh Pirates (2006–2008); New York Yankees (2008–2009); Chicago Cubs (2010); Arizona Diamondbacks (2011); Washington Nationals (2012); San Francisco Giants (2012); San Diego Padres (2014)

Career highlights and awards
- World Series champion (2012)

Xavier Clifford Nady VI (/ɛkˈseɪviər ˈneɪdi/; born November 14, 1978) is an American former professional baseball outfielder and first baseman. Nady played in Major League Baseball (MLB) for the New York Mets, Pittsburgh Pirates, New York Yankees, Chicago Cubs, Arizona Diamondbacks, Washington Nationals, San Francisco Giants, and the San Diego Padres.

== Early life ==
Xavier Clifford Nady VI was born on November 14, 1978, in Salinas, California. Nady was named Northern California Player of the Year in his senior year of high school. The St. Louis Cardinals originally drafted Nady in the fourth round of the 1997 Major League Baseball draft (134th overall), but he did not sign professionally at that time.

== College career ==
Nady instead attended University of California, Berkeley, where he set the all-time Pac-10 Conference record for career slugging percentage (.729) for the California Golden Bears baseball team. In 2021, Nady was inducted into the California Athletics Hall of Fame.

== Professional career ==
=== Draft and San Diego Padres (2000, 2003–2005) ===
Nady was selected in the second round of the 2000 Major League Baseball draft by the San Diego Padres (49th overall). He signed a major-league contract and became the 21st drafted player to make his debut in the major leagues without first playing in the minor leagues, since the introduction of the amateur draft in 1965.

Nady only appeared in one major-league game before being sent to the minor leagues. He was named Padres Minor League Player of the Year in 2001, also collecting the California League MVP and Rookie of the Year awards that season. Nady underwent Tommy John surgery after the 2001 season and had limited playing time in 2002. In 2003, he again returned to the major league level for part of the season, earning NL Rookie of the Month honors in May. He ultimately spent most of his time in the minor leagues.

In late June 2005, Nady became the first Padre since Greg Vaughn (in 1998) to homer in four consecutive games.

=== New York Mets (2006) ===
The Padres traded him to the New York Mets for Mike Cameron on November 18, 2005. Nady underwent an emergency appendectomy early in the morning on May 30, 2006. As a result, he was placed on the 15-day disabled list, and returned to the lineup on June 18.

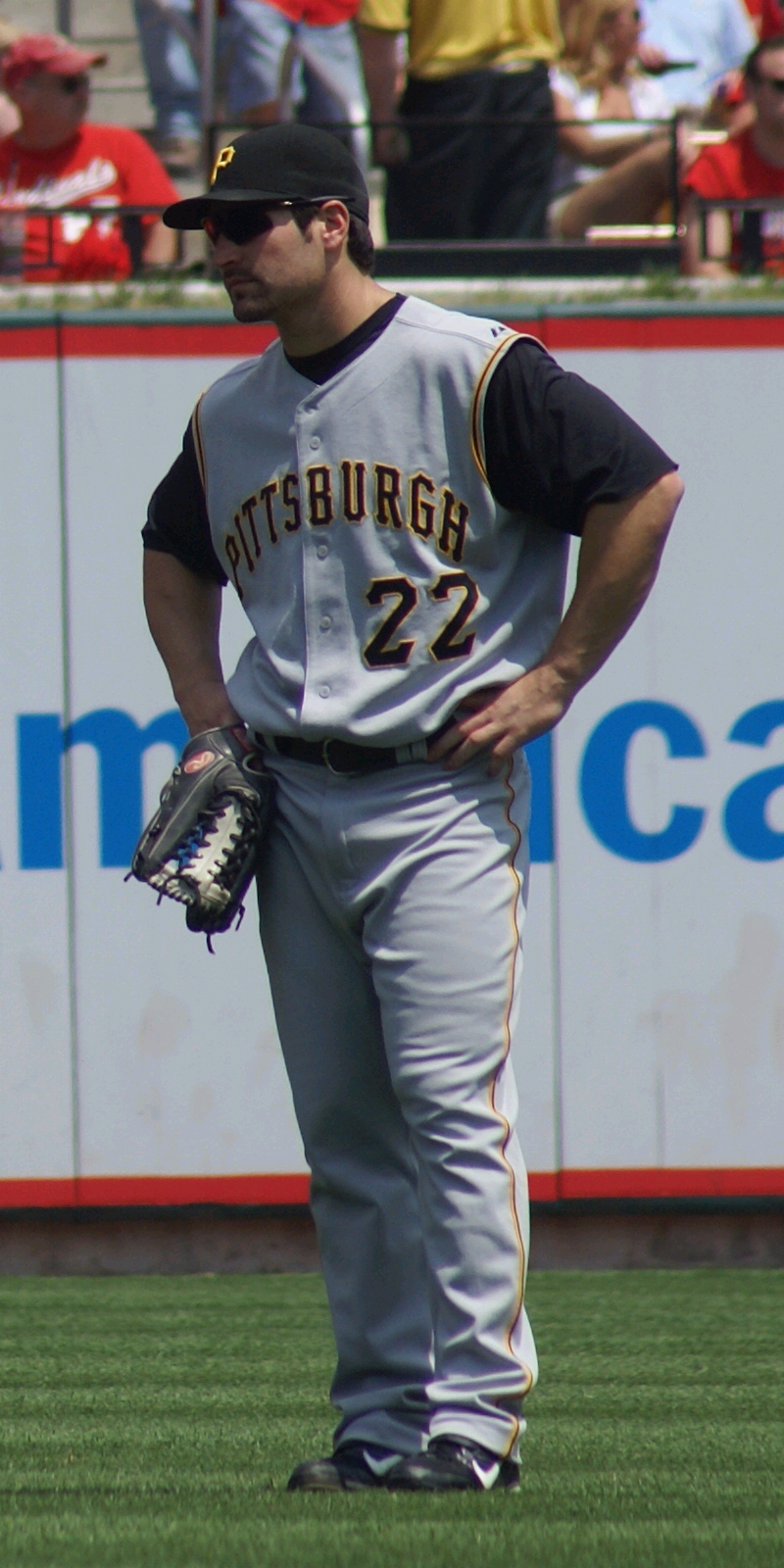
Nady with the Pittsburgh Pirates in 2007

=== Pittsburgh Pirates (2006–2008) ===
On July 30, 2006, Mets set-up relief pitcher Duaner Sánchez was injured when the cab in which he was a passenger was broadsided. The Mets' pitching corps was already depleted with star pitcher Pedro Martínez on the disabled list. Desperate for pitching, the Mets were forced to give up Nady, their starting right fielder, to the Pirates in exchange for pitchers Óliver Pérez and Roberto Hernández.

In September 2007, Nady was hit in the head with a pitch and later diagnosed with a concussion. He was named NL Player of the Week for the week of April 6, 2008, hitting .385 (10-26) with 3 home runs and 9 runs batted in.

=== New York Yankees (2008–2009) ===
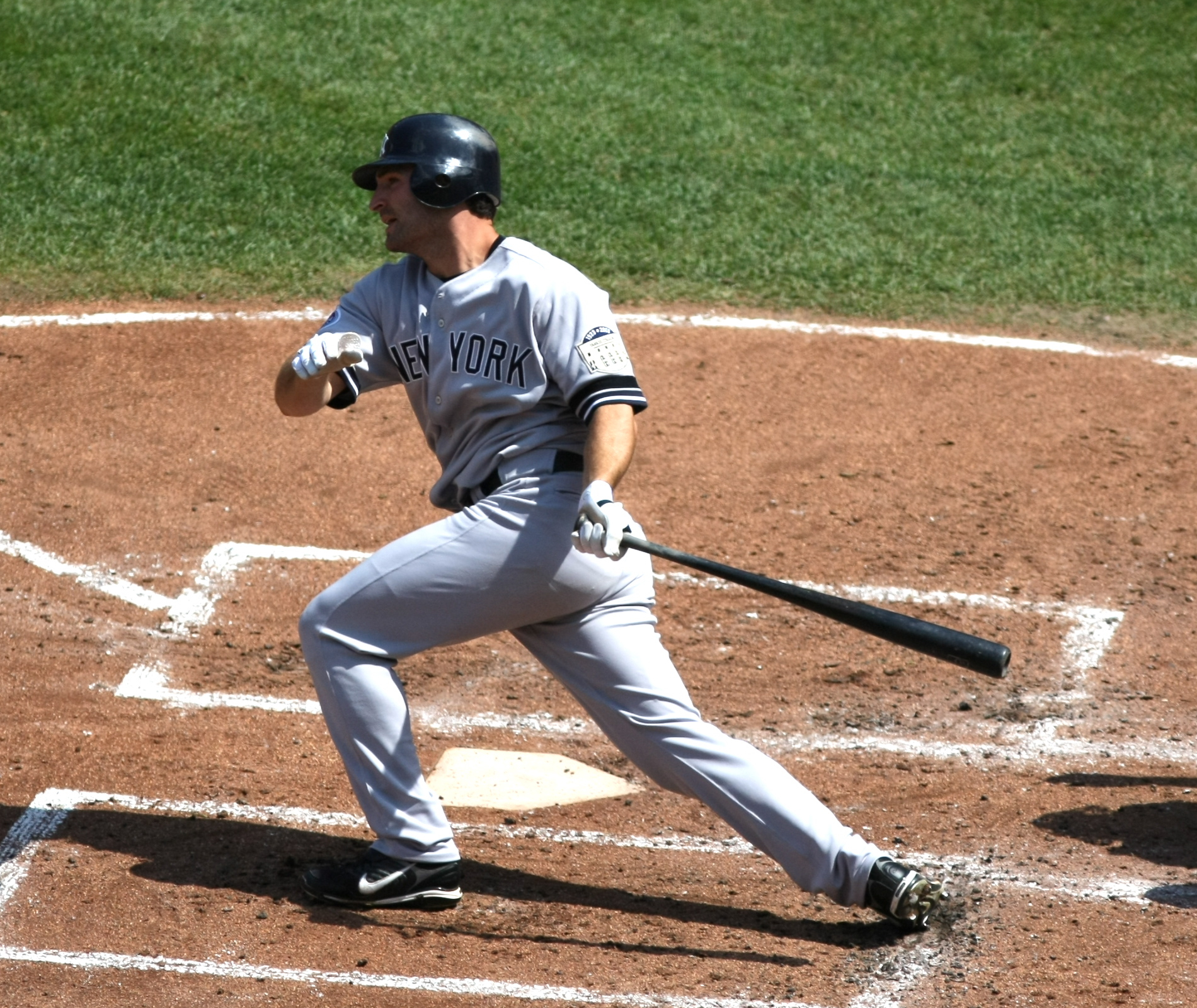
Nady with the Yankees in 2008

On July 26, 2008, the New York Yankees acquired Nady and pitcher Dámaso Marte from the Pittsburgh Pirates for José Tábata, Ross Ohlendorf, Daniel McCutchen, and Jeff Karstens.

Nady had a career-high six (6) RBIs as the Yankees came back to beat the Los Angeles Angels on August 3, 2008. Nady was named AL Player of the Week for his performance. He finished the 2008 season setting career-highs in home runs (25) and runs batted in (97), and had a .305 batting average.

On January 21, 2009, Nady signed a one-year contract worth $6.65 million with the Yankees, thus avoiding arbitration. On April 14, 2009, Nady suffered a right-elbow injury which ultimately required a second Tommy John surgery on July 8, despite an initial attempt to rehab the injury. The surgery ended his 2009 season. As a result, Nick Swisher took over in Nady's position for the remainder of the 2009 season. Nady spent the season (including the postseason) on the disabled list until the Yankees won the 2009 World Series against the Philadelphia Phillies. He filed for free agency following the conclusion of the 2009 season.

While Nady played only seven games for the Yankees in 2009, he did receive a World Series ring following the team's Series victory that season.

=== Chicago Cubs (2010) ===
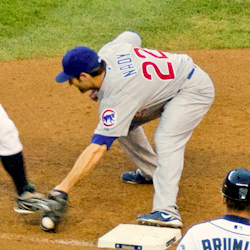
Nady playing first base for the Chicago Cubs in 2010

On January 29, 2010, Nady signed a one-year contract with the Chicago Cubs. On May 16, 2010, Nady hit a game-winning RBI single in the eighth inning against the Pirates, as the Cubs won 4–3. Nady finished the season with a .256 batting average, six home runs and 33 runs batted in. He became a free agent after the end of the season.

=== Arizona Diamondbacks (2011) ===
Nady signed a one-year contract with the Arizona Diamondbacks on December 15, 2010. He became a free agent after the end of the season.

=== Washington Nationals (2012) ===
Nady signed a minor league contract with the Washington Nationals on March 18, 2012. He was called up by the Nationals on April 4. Following a trip to the disabled list midway through the season, Nady was designated for assignment on July 21, 2012 and released on July 29, 2012. Nationals outfielder Bryce Harper, a rookie during the 2012 season, later named Nady among the veteran teammates from whom he learned early on in his playing career.

=== San Francisco Giants (2012) ===
Nady was signed to a minor league contract by the San Francisco Giants on August 4, 2012, and assigned to their Triple-A affiliate in Fresno, California. He made his debut for the Giants on September 1, 2012, and hit a three-run double against the Cubs in his first at-bat. On September 30, Nady hit a game-tying ninth-inning home run against the San Diego Padres in a game that the Giants went on to win. He was on the active roster during the 2012 World Series in which the team swept the Detroit Tigers in four games.

=== Kansas City Royals ===
On December 14, 2012, Nady signed a minor league contract with the Kansas City Royals. During Spring training, Nady struggled first with plantar fasciitis and then sustained a partial tear in his right heel. The Royals released him on March 25, 2013, and then re-signed him to a Minor League contract later the same week. He played with their Triple-A team in Omaha. Nady was released on June 29.

=== Colorado Rockies ===
Nady signed a minor league deal with the Colorado Rockies on June 30, 2013.

=== Second stint with Padres (2014) ===
Nady signed a minor league deal with the San Diego Padres in January 2014. He was designated for assignment on May 5, 2014. On May 11, Nady refused his outright assignment and elected free agency.

=== Seattle Mariners ===
On May 27, 2014, Nady signed a minor league deal with the Seattle Mariners. He exercised an opt-out clause in his contract on June 26, becoming a free agent.

== Coaching career ==
On June 20, 2015, Nady began his tenure as the hitting coach for the Lake Elsinore Storm, the Single A affiliate of the San Diego Padres. He has since taken a job as a scout and recruiter for agent Scott Boras.

== Personal life ==
Nady's wife, Meredith, had their first child, a son named Xavier VII, on July 15, 2008. His second son was born on September 8, 2011. The Nady family traces its lineage back to France before moving to Iowa in the mid-19th century. The first Xavier Nady can be traced back to the 16th century French hamlet of Auxelles-Bas. His uncle is boxing referee Jay Nady. His cousin is football coach Jeff Nady.

After an intestinal illness prior to spring training in 2007, Nady was tested for Crohn's disease due to family history of the disease. The tests turned out negative and Nady was instead diagnosed with a minor infection of the small intestines.

== See also ==
- List of baseball players who went directly to Major League Baseball
