= Romagny-sous-Rougemont =

- Commune
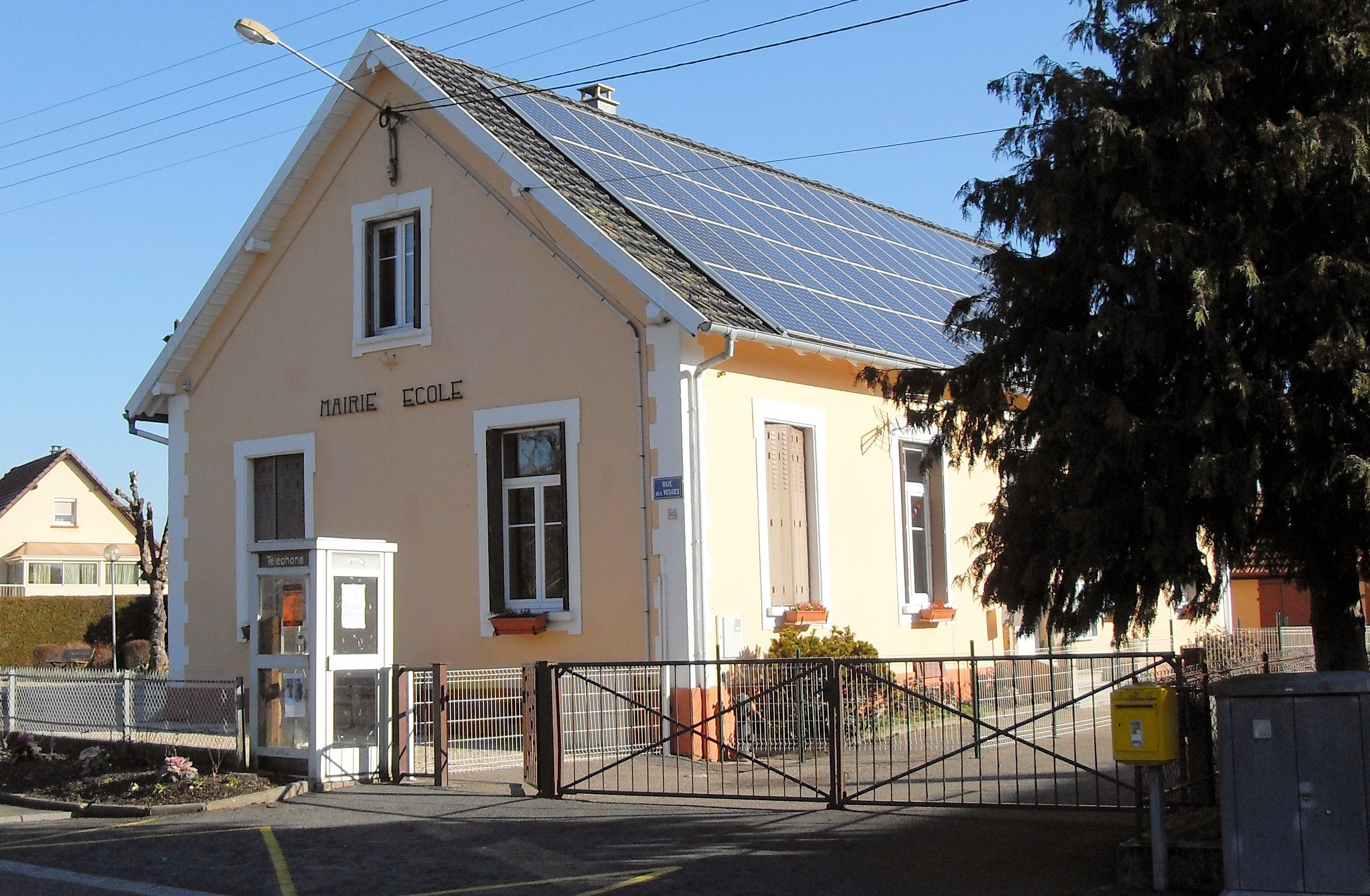
- Town hall-school

- Coat of arms
- Location of Romagny-sous-Rougemont
- Location within France Location within Bourgogne-Franche-Comté
- Coordinates: 47°43′06″N 6°58′06″E
- Country: France
- Region: Bourgogne-Franche-Comté
- Department: Territoire de Belfort
- Arrondissement: Belfort
- Canton: Giromagny

Government
  - Mayor (2021–2026): Jean-Marie Hugard
- Area^{1}: 2.47 km^{2} (0.95 sq mi)
- Highest elevation: 538 m (1,765 ft)
- Lowest elevation: 390 m (1,280 ft)
- Population (2023): 213
  - Density: 86.2/km^{2} (223/sq mi)
- Time zone: UTC+01:00 (CET)
  - Summer (DST): UTC+02:00 (CEST)
- INSEE/Postal code: 90086 /90110
- ^{1} French Land Register data, which excludes lakes, ponds, glaciers > 1 km^{2} (0.386 sq mi or 247 acres) and river estuaries.

Romagny-sous-Rougemont (French pronunciation: [ʁɔmaɲi su ʁuʒmɔ̃], literally Romagny under Rougemont) is a commune in the Territoire de Belfort department in Bourgogne-Franche-Comté in northeastern France.

== See also ==
- Communes of the Territoire de Belfort department
