= Lachapelle-sous-Rougemont =

- Commune
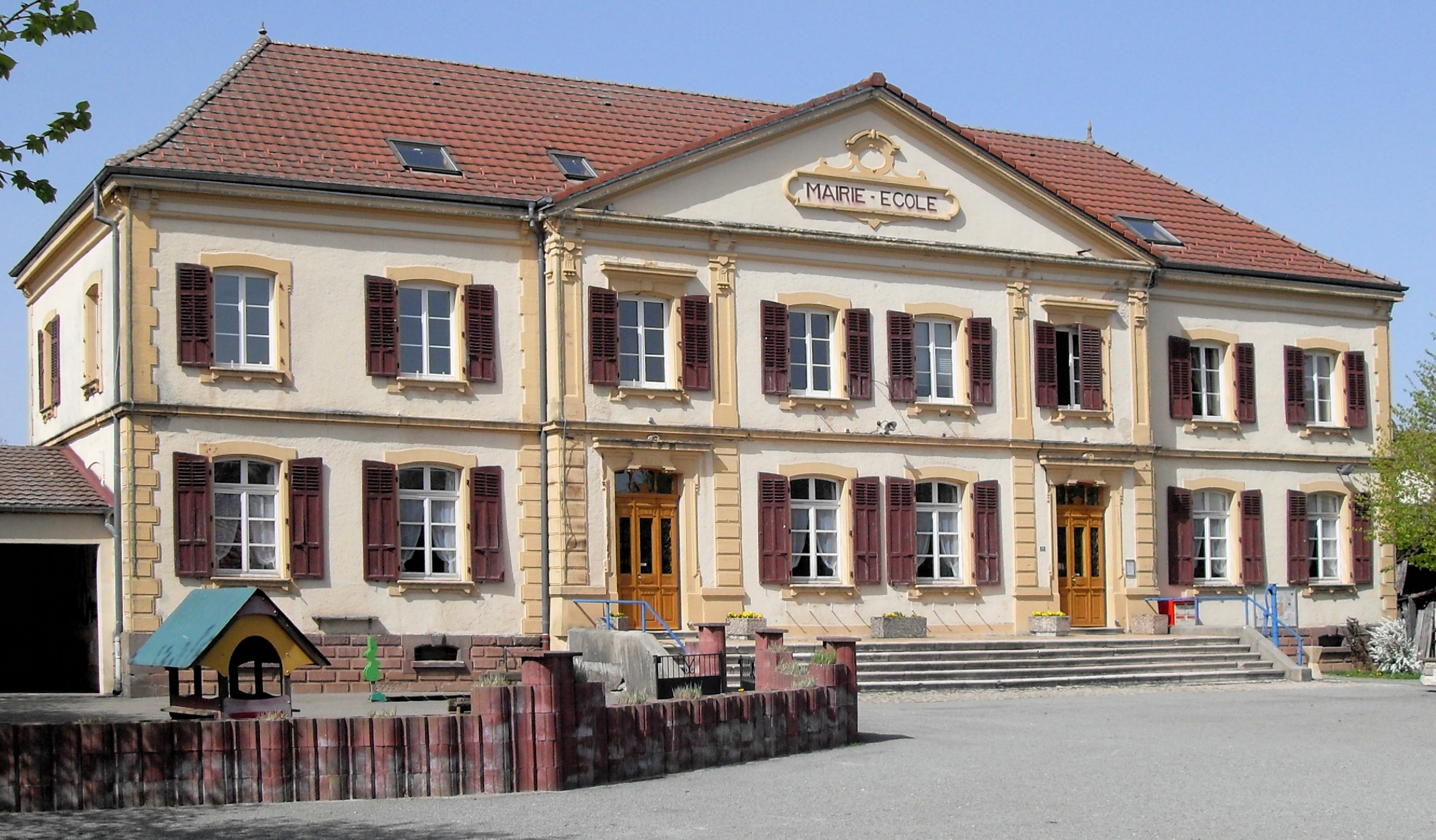
- Town hall-school

- Coat of arms
- Location of Lachapelle-sous-Rougemont
- Location within France Location within Bourgogne-Franche-Comté
- Coordinates: 47°42′47″N 7°00′59″E
- Country: France
- Region: Bourgogne-Franche-Comté
- Department: Territoire de Belfort
- Arrondissement: Belfort
- Canton: Giromagny
- Intercommunality: Vosges du Sud

Government
  - Mayor (2020–2026): Éric Parrot
- Area^{1}: 4.89 km^{2} (1.89 sq mi)
- Highest elevation: 403 m (1,322 ft)
- Lowest elevation: 372 m (1,220 ft)
- Population (2023): 539
  - Density: 110/km^{2} (285/sq mi)
- Time zone: UTC+01:00 (CET)
  - Summer (DST): UTC+02:00 (CEST)
- INSEE/Postal code: 90058 /90360
- ^{1} French Land Register data, which excludes lakes, ponds, glaciers > 1 km^{2} (0.386 sq mi or 247 acres) and river estuaries.

Lachapelle-sous-Rougemont (French pronunciation: [laʃapɛl su ʁuʒmɔ̃], literally Lachapelle under Rougemont) is a commune in the Territoire de Belfort department in Bourgogne-Franche-Comté in northeastern France.

== See also ==
- Communes of the Territoire de Belfort department
