= Villers-le-Sec =

Villers-le-Sec may refer to the following communes in France:

- Villers-le-Sec, Aisne, in the Aisne département
- Villers-le-Sec, Marne, in the Marne département
- Villers-le-Sec, Meuse, in the Meuse département
- Villers-le-Sec, Haute-Saône, in the Haute-Saône département

== See also ==
- Villiers-le-Sec (disambiguation)
