= Bourg-sous-Châtelet =

- Commune
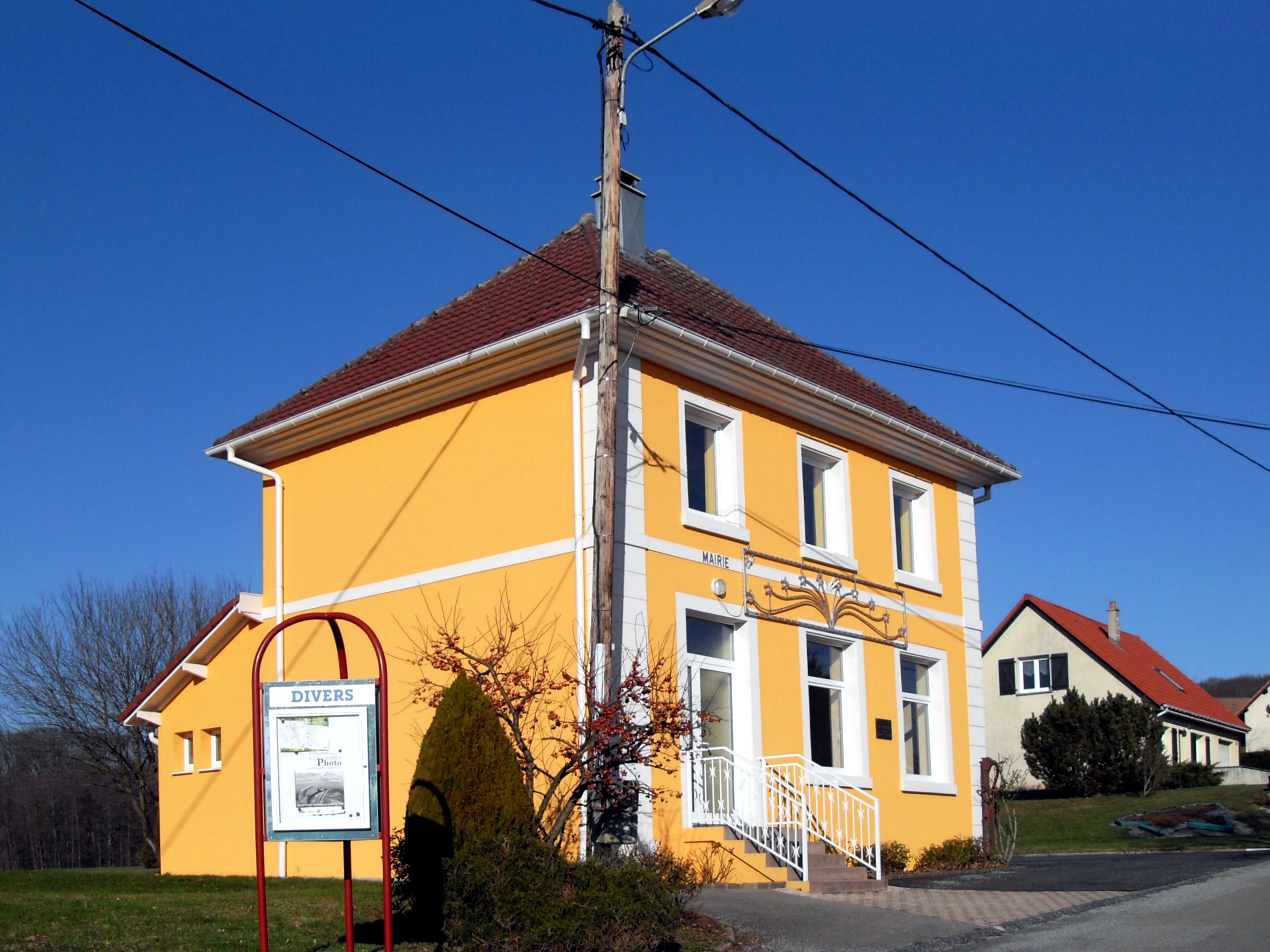
- The town hall of Bourg-sous-Châtelet

- Coat of arms
- Location of Bourg-sous-Châtelet
- Location within France Location within Bourgogne-Franche-Comté
- Coordinates: 47°42′10″N 6°56′54″E
- Country: France
- Region: Bourgogne-Franche-Comté
- Department: Territoire de Belfort
- Arrondissement: Belfort
- Canton: Giromagny
- Intercommunality: Vosges du Sud

Government
  - Mayor (2020–2026): Armand Nawrot
- Area^{1}: 0.84 km^{2} (0.32 sq mi)
- Highest elevation: 481 m (1,578 ft)
- Lowest elevation: 386 m (1,266 ft)
- Population (2023): 115
  - Density: 140/km^{2} (350/sq mi)
- Time zone: UTC+01:00 (CET)
  - Summer (DST): UTC+02:00 (CEST)
- INSEE/Postal code: 90016 /90110
- ^{1} French Land Register data, which excludes lakes, ponds, glaciers > 1 km^{2} (0.386 sq mi or 247 acres) and river estuaries.

Bourg-sous-Châtelet (French pronunciation: [buʁ su ʃatlɛ]) is a commune in the Territoire de Belfort department in Bourgogne-Franche-Comté in northeastern France.

== See also ==
- Communes of the Territoire de Belfort department
