= Leval, Territoire de Belfort =

Leval
- Commune
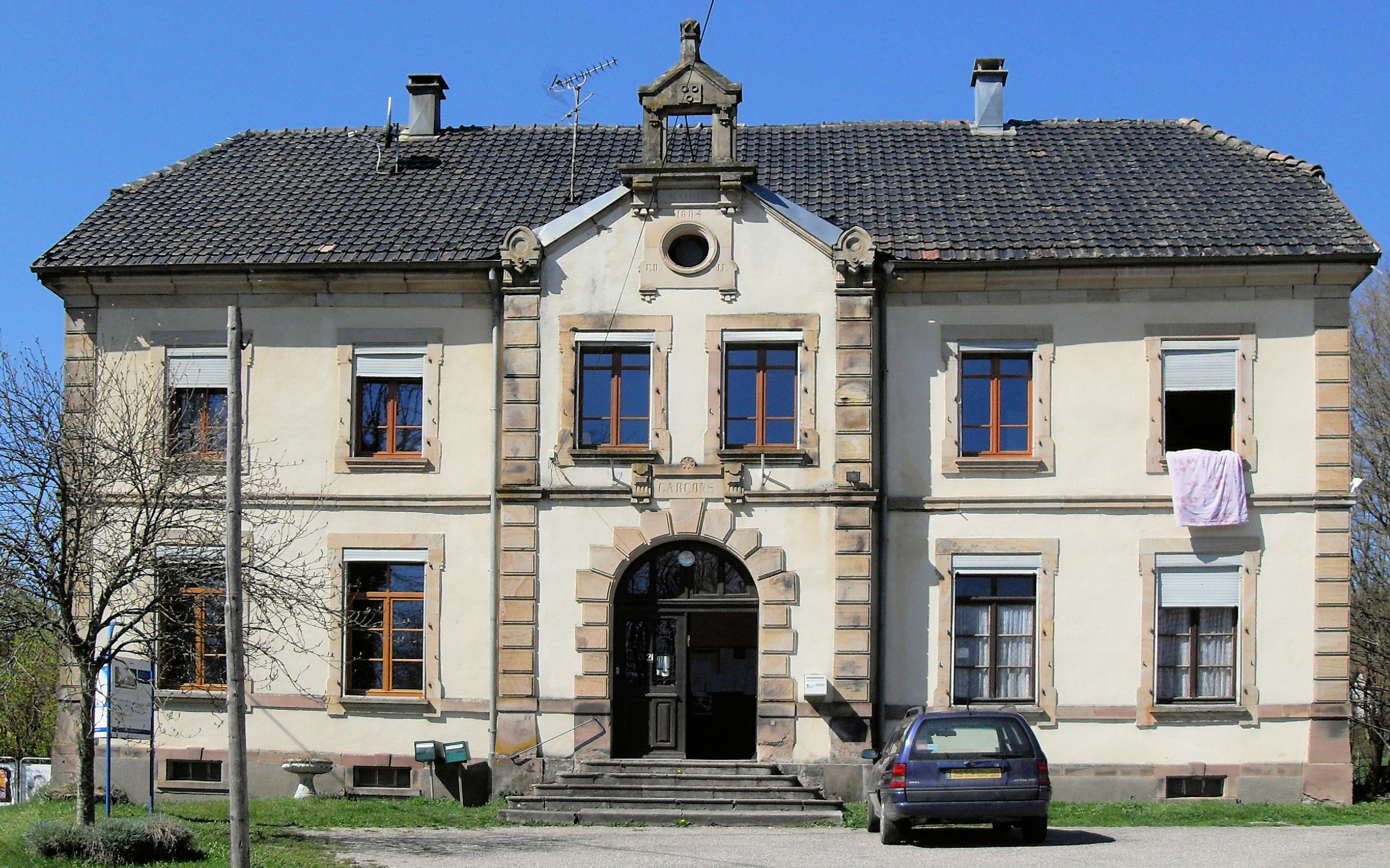
- Town hall

- Coat of arms
- Location of Leval
- Location within France Location within Bourgogne-Franche-Comté
- Coordinates: 47°43′47″N 6°58′56″E
- Country: France
- Region: Bourgogne-Franche-Comté
- Department: Territoire de Belfort
- Arrondissement: Belfort
- Canton: Giromagny
- Intercommunality: CC Vosges du Sud

Government
  - Mayor (2020–2026): Marc Jacquey
- Area^{1}: 6.00 km^{2} (2.32 sq mi)
- Highest elevation: 456 m (1,496 ft)
- Lowest elevation: 393 m (1,289 ft)
- Population (2023): 250
  - Density: 42/km^{2} (110/sq mi)
- Time zone: UTC+01:00 (CET)
  - Summer (DST): UTC+02:00 (CEST)
- INSEE/Postal code: 90066 /90110
- ^{1} French Land Register data, which excludes lakes, ponds, glaciers > 1 km^{2} (0.386 sq mi or 247 acres) and river estuaries.

Leval (French pronunciation: [ləval]) is a commune in the Territoire de Belfort department in Bourgogne-Franche-Comté in northeastern France.

== See also ==
- Communes of the Territoire de Belfort department
