= Canton of Giromagny =

Coordinates: 47.74°N 6.83°E

- Canton
- Situation of the canton of Giromagny in the department of Territoire de Belfort
- Country: France
- Region: Bourgogne-Franche-Comté
- Department: Territoire de Belfort
- No. of communes: {{{nbcomm}}}
- Population (2023): 15,049
- INSEE code: 9007

The canton of Giromagny is an administrative division of the Territoire de Belfort department, northeastern France. Its borders were modified at the French canton reorganisation which came into effect in March 2015. Its seat is in Giromagny.

It consists of the following communes:

1. Anjoutey
2. Auxelles-Bas
3. Auxelles-Haut
4. Bourg-sous-Châtelet
5. Chaux
6. Étueffont
7. Felon
8. Giromagny
9. Grosmagny
10. Lachapelle-sous-Chaux
11. Lachapelle-sous-Rougemont
12. Lamadeleine-Val-des-Anges
13. Lepuix
14. Leval
15. Petitefontaine
16. Petitmagny
17. Riervescemont
18. Romagny-sous-Rougemont
19. Rougegoutte
20. Rougemont-le-Château
21. Saint-Germain-le-Châtelet
22. Vescemont
