= Vescemont =

- Commune
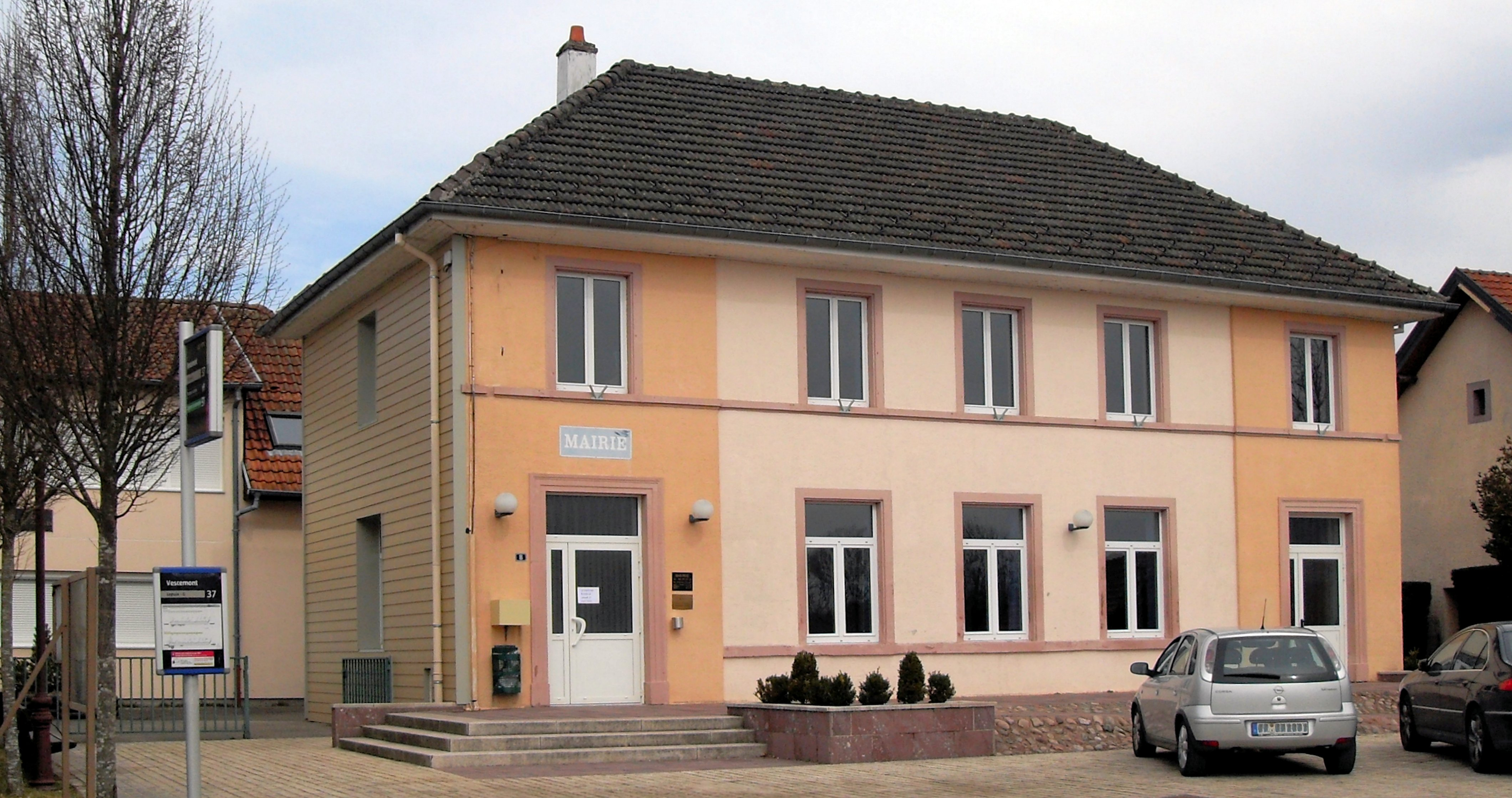
- Town hall
- Location of Vescemont
- Location within France Location within Bourgogne-Franche-Comté
- Coordinates: 47°44′37″N 6°50′42″E
- Country: France
- Region: Bourgogne-Franche-Comté
- Department: Territoire de Belfort
- Arrondissement: Belfort
- Canton: Giromagny

Government
  - Mayor (2020–2026): Christian Canal
- Area^{1}: 7.05 km^{2} (2.72 sq mi)
- Highest elevation: 988 m (3,241 ft)
- Lowest elevation: 458 m (1,503 ft)
- Population (2023): 717
  - Density: 102/km^{2} (263/sq mi)
- Time zone: UTC+01:00 (CET)
  - Summer (DST): UTC+02:00 (CEST)
- INSEE/Postal code: 90102 /90200
- ^{1} French Land Register data, which excludes lakes, ponds, glaciers > 1 km^{2} (0.386 sq mi or 247 acres) and river estuaries.

Vescemont (French pronunciation: [vɛsmɔ̃]) is a commune in the Territoire de Belfort department in Bourgogne-Franche-Comté in northeastern France.

== See also ==
- Communes of the Territoire de Belfort department
