= Villiers-le-Sec =

Villiers-le-Sec may refer to the following communes in France:

- Villiers-le-Sec, Calvados, in the Calvados département
- Villiers-le-Sec, Haute-Marne, in the Haute-Marne département
- Villiers-le-Sec, Nièvre, in the Nièvre département
- Villiers-le-Sec, Val-d'Oise, in the Val-d'Oise département
