= Saint-Germain-le-Châtelet =

- Commune
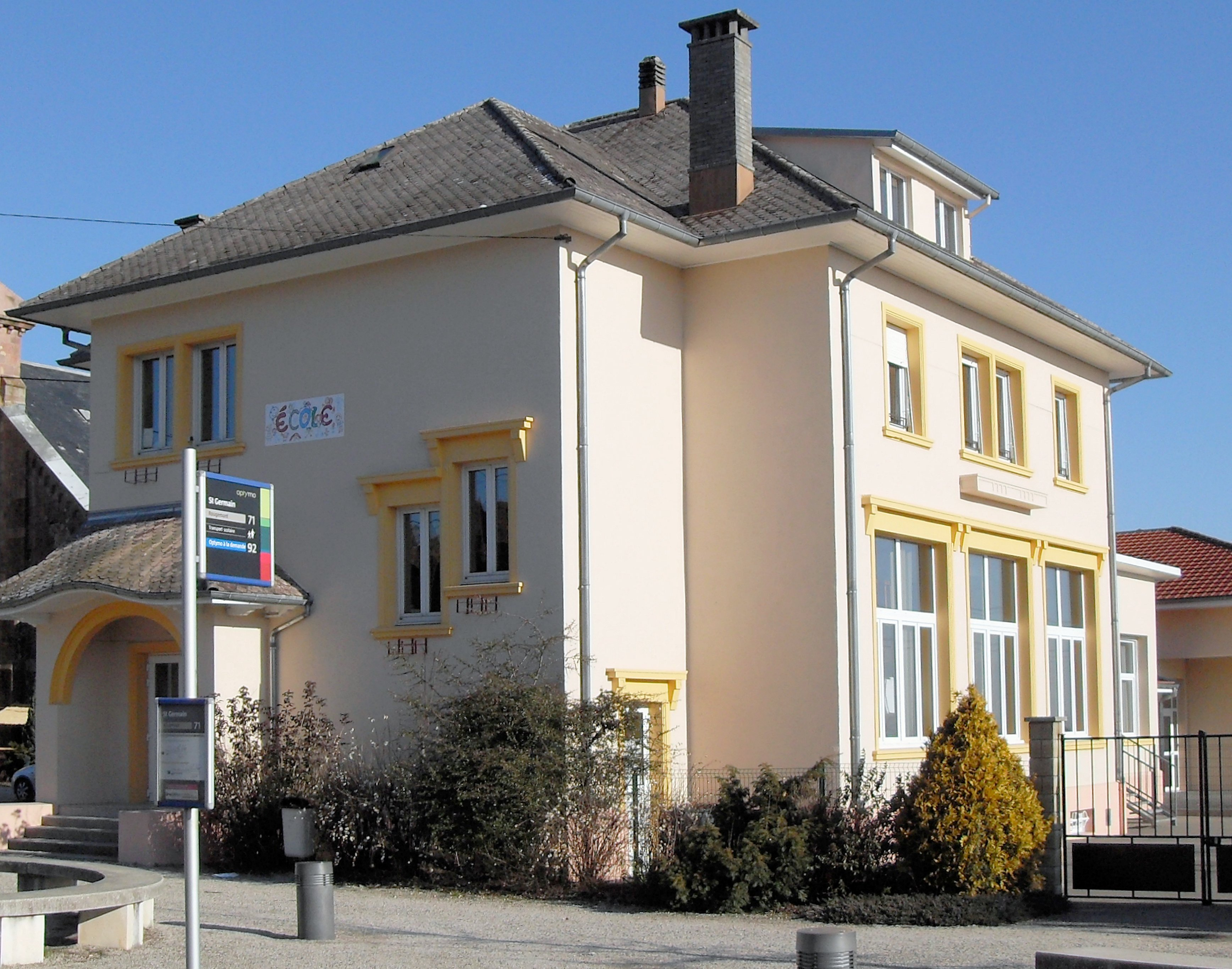
- Primary school

- Coat of arms
- Location of Saint-Germain-le-Châtelet
- Location within France Location within Bourgogne-Franche-Comté
- Coordinates: 47°41′46″N 6°57′31″E
- Country: France
- Region: Bourgogne-Franche-Comté
- Department: Territoire de Belfort
- Arrondissement: Belfort
- Canton: Giromagny
- Intercommunality: CC Vosges du Sud

Government
  - Mayor (2020–2026): Jean-Luc Anderhueber
- Area^{1}: 3.36 km^{2} (1.30 sq mi)
- Highest elevation: 540 m (1,770 ft)
- Lowest elevation: 365 m (1,198 ft)
- Population (2023): 654
  - Density: 195/km^{2} (504/sq mi)
- Time zone: UTC+01:00 (CET)
  - Summer (DST): UTC+02:00 (CEST)
- INSEE/Postal code: 90091 /90110
- ^{1} French Land Register data, which excludes lakes, ponds, glaciers > 1 km^{2} (0.386 sq mi or 247 acres) and river estuaries.

Saint-Germain-le-Châtelet (French pronunciation: [sɛ̃ ʒɛʁmɛ̃ lə ʃatlɛ]) is a commune in the Territoire de Belfort department in Bourgogne-Franche-Comté in northeastern France.

== See also ==
- Communes of the Territoire de Belfort department
