= Girecourt-sur-Durbion =

- Commune
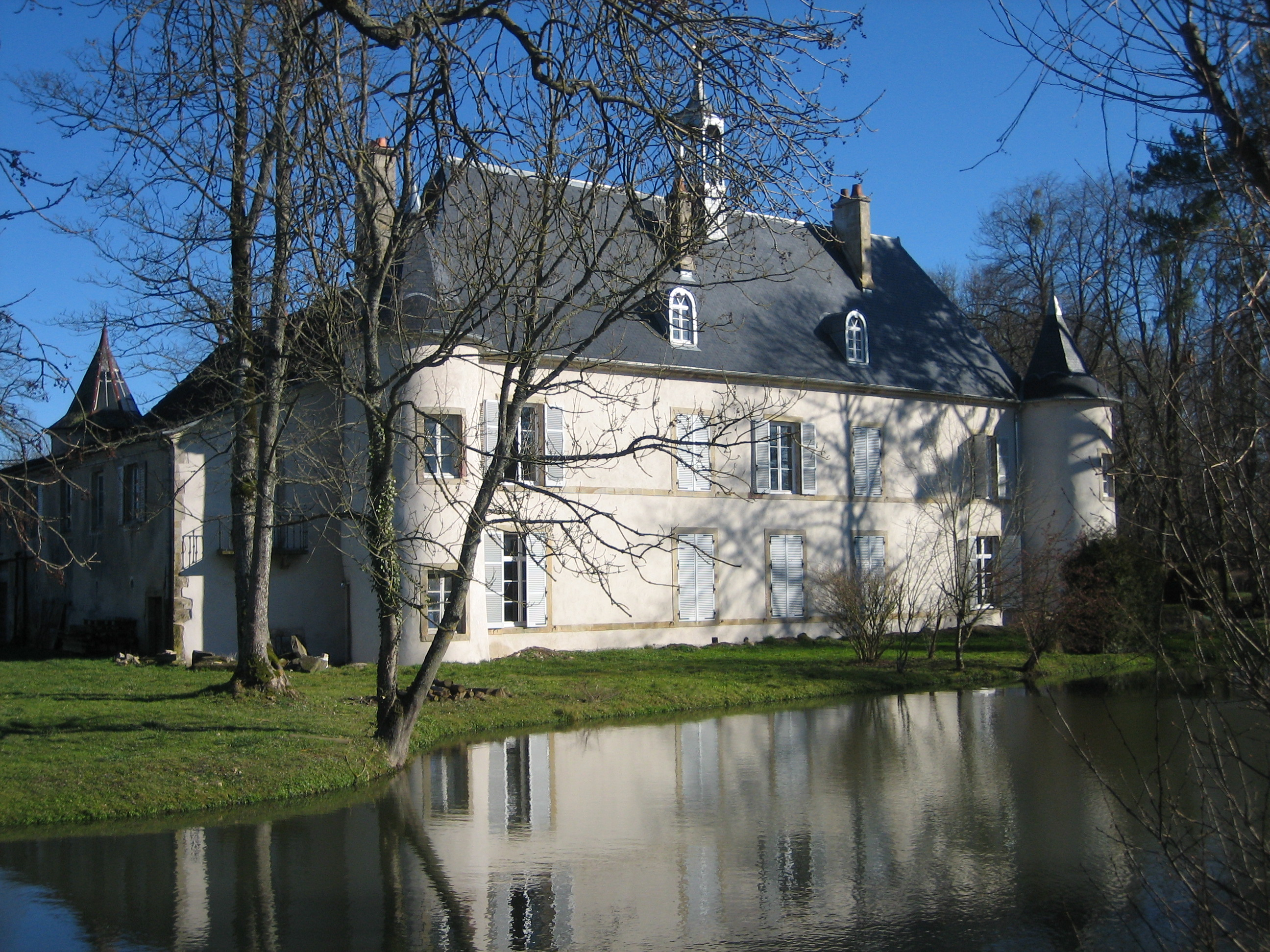
- The chateau in Girecourt-sur-Durbion
- Location of Girecourt-sur-Durbion
- Location within France Location within Grand Est
- Coordinates: 48°14′52″N 6°36′02″E
- Country: France
- Region: Grand Est
- Department: Vosges
- Arrondissement: Saint-Dié-des-Vosges
- Canton: Bruyères
- Intercommunality: CC Bruyères - Vallons des Vosges

Government
  - Mayor (2021–2026): Catherine Holveck
- Area^{1}: 6.92 km^{2} (2.67 sq mi)
- Elevation: 335 m (1,099 ft)
- Highest elevation: 357 m (1,171 ft)
- Lowest elevation: 330 m (1,080 ft)
- Population (2023): 350
  - Density: 51/km^{2} (130/sq mi)
- Time zone: UTC+01:00 (CET)
  - Summer (DST): UTC+02:00 (CEST)
- INSEE/Postal code: 88203 /88600
- ^{1} French Land Register data, which excludes lakes, ponds, glaciers > 1 km^{2} (0.386 sq mi or 247 acres) and river estuaries.

Girecourt-sur-Durbion (French pronunciation: [ʒiʁkuʁ syʁ dyʁbjɔ̃], lit. 'Girecourt on Durbion') is a commune in the Vosges department in Grand Est in northeastern France.

== See also ==
- Communes of the Vosges department
