= Lepuix =

- Commune
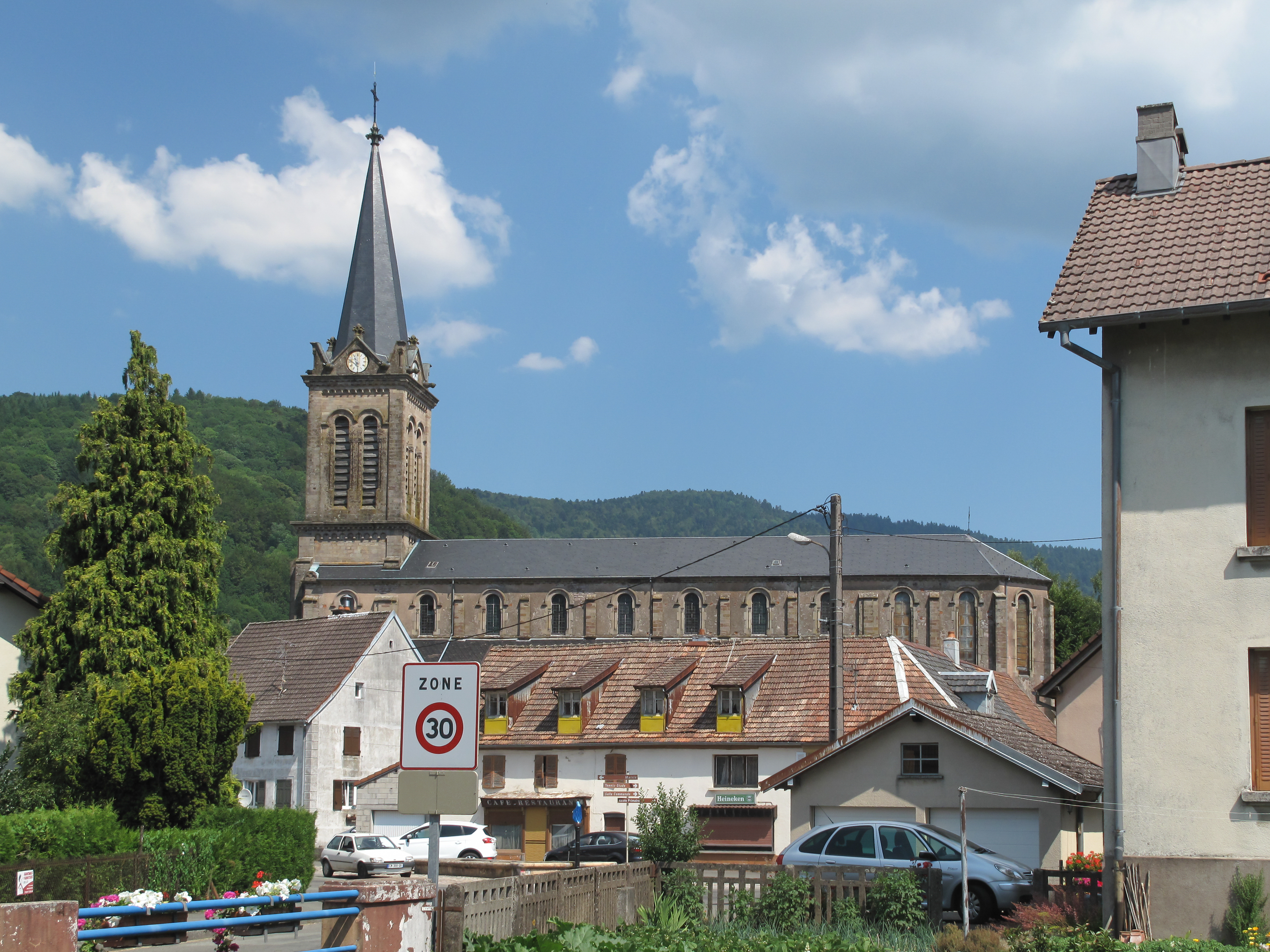
- Church of the Nativity of Our Lady

- Coat of arms
- Location of Lepuix
- Location within France Location within Bourgogne-Franche-Comté
- Coordinates: 47°45′40″N 6°48′52″E
- Country: France
- Region: Bourgogne-Franche-Comté
- Department: Territoire de Belfort
- Arrondissement: Belfort
- Canton: Giromagny

Government
  - Mayor (2020–2026): Daniel Roth
- Area^{1}: 29.69 km^{2} (11.46 sq mi)
- Highest elevation: 1,244 m (4,081 ft)
- Lowest elevation: 489 m (1,604 ft)
- Population (2023): 1,115
  - Density: 37.55/km^{2} (97.27/sq mi)
- Time zone: UTC+01:00 (CET)
  - Summer (DST): UTC+02:00 (CEST)
- INSEE/Postal code: 90065 /90200
- ^{1} French Land Register data, which excludes lakes, ponds, glaciers > 1 km^{2} (0.386 sq mi or 247 acres) and river estuaries.

Lepuix (French pronunciation: [ləpɥi]) is a commune in the Territoire de Belfort department in Bourgogne-Franche-Comté in northeastern France.

== Geography ==
=== Climate ===
Lepuix has a humid continental climate (Köppen climate classification Dfb). The average annual temperature in Lepuix is 6.3 °C (43.3 °F). The average annual rainfall is 2,387.7 mm (94.00 in) with December as the wettest month. The temperatures are highest on average in July, at around 14.5 °C (58.1 °F), and lowest in January, at around −1.2 °C (29.8 °F). The highest temperature ever recorded in Lepuix was 32.3 °C (90.1 °F) on 24 July 2019; the coldest temperature ever recorded was −19.1 °C (−2.4 °F) on 20 December 2009.

Climate data for Ballon d'Alsace, Lepuix (1981–2010 averages, extremes 1987−present)
Month	Jan	Feb	Mar	Apr	May	Jun	Jul	Aug	Sep	Oct	Nov	Dec	Year
Record high °C (°F)	14.3 (57.7)	17.0 (62.6)	18.4 (65.1)	22.5 (72.5)	26.4 (79.5)	29.7 (85.5)	32.3 (90.1)	31.3 (88.3)	26.3 (79.3)	22.4 (72.3)	18.5 (65.3)	13.8 (56.8)	32.3 (90.1)
Mean daily maximum °C (°F)	1.1 (34.0)	1.5 (34.7)	4.1 (39.4)	8.7 (47.7)	13.4 (56.1)	16.8 (62.2)	18.2 (64.8)	17.9 (64.2)	13.8 (56.8)	10.2 (50.4)	4.4 (39.9)	1.4 (34.5)	9.3 (48.7)
Daily mean °C (°F)	−1.2 (29.8)	−1.0 (30.2)	1.3 (34.3)	5.3 (41.5)	9.7 (49.5)	13.0 (55.4)	14.5 (58.1)	14.4 (57.9)	10.6 (51.1)	7.5 (45.5)	2.2 (36.0)	−0.9 (30.4)	6.3 (43.3)
Mean daily minimum °C (°F)	−3.6 (25.5)	−3.5 (25.7)	−1.5 (29.3)	1.9 (35.4)	6.1 (43.0)	9.1 (48.4)	10.7 (51.3)	11.0 (51.8)	7.4 (45.3)	4.7 (40.5)	−0.1 (31.8)	−3.1 (26.4)	3.3 (37.9)
Record low °C (°F)	−15.9 (3.4)	−18.8 (−1.8)	−15.7 (3.7)	−9.3 (15.3)	−3.6 (25.5)	−0.9 (30.4)	3.9 (39.0)	2.5 (36.5)	−0.2 (31.6)	−7.7 (18.1)	−13.8 (7.2)	−19.1 (−2.4)	−19.1 (−2.4)
Average precipitation mm (inches)	243.3 (9.58)	234.6 (9.24)	221.1 (8.70)	130.8 (5.15)	186.4 (7.34)	126.6 (4.98)	163.8 (6.45)	183.0 (7.20)	164.6 (6.48)	225.7 (8.89)	226.5 (8.92)	281.3 (11.07)	2,387.7 (94.00)
Average precipitation days (≥ 1.0 mm)	14.3	15.0	15.1	13.3	14.8	12.1	13.6	14.3	11.2	13.9	15.5	16.4	169.3
Source: Meteociel

== Gallery ==
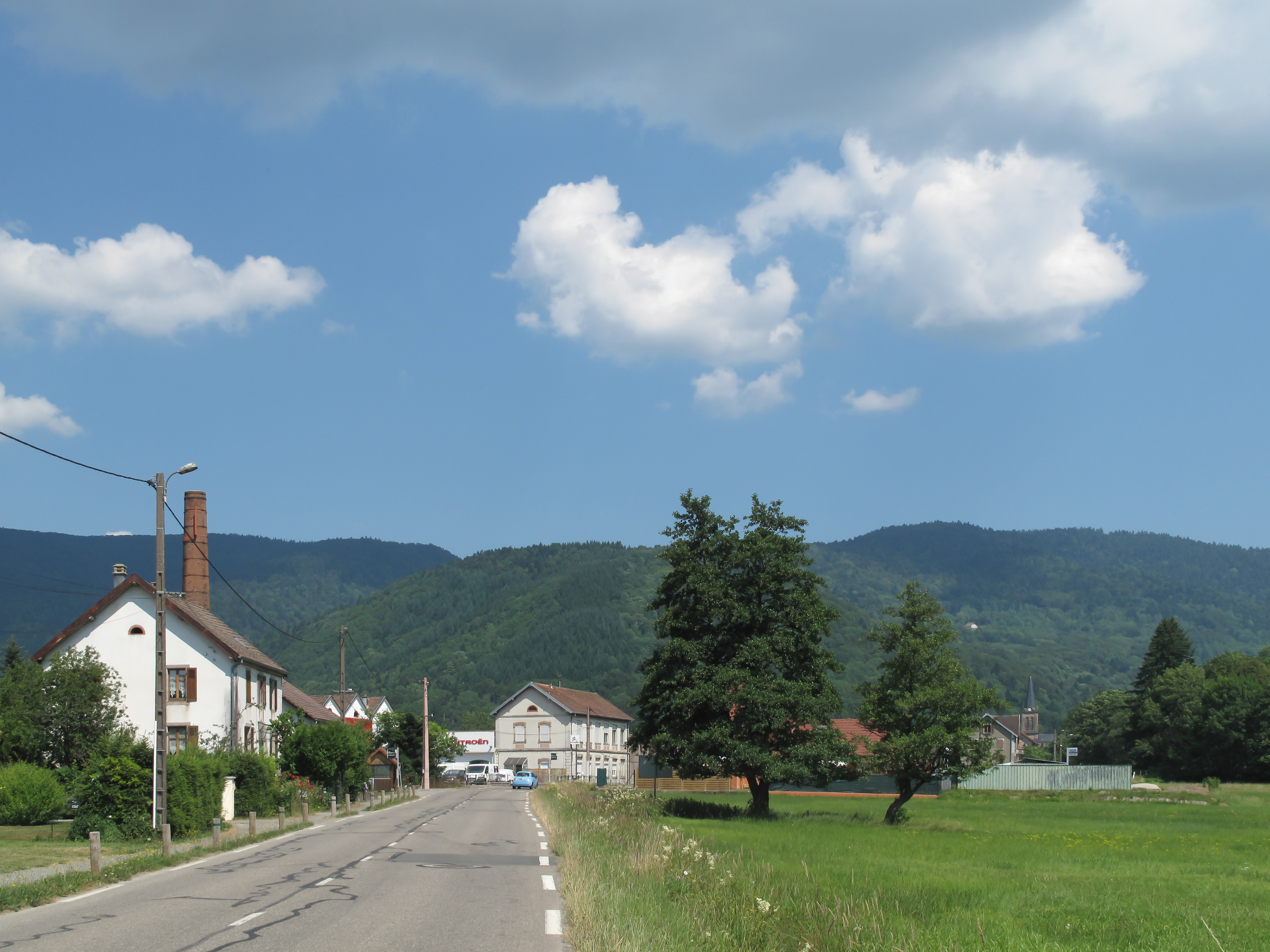
Lepuix, view to a village

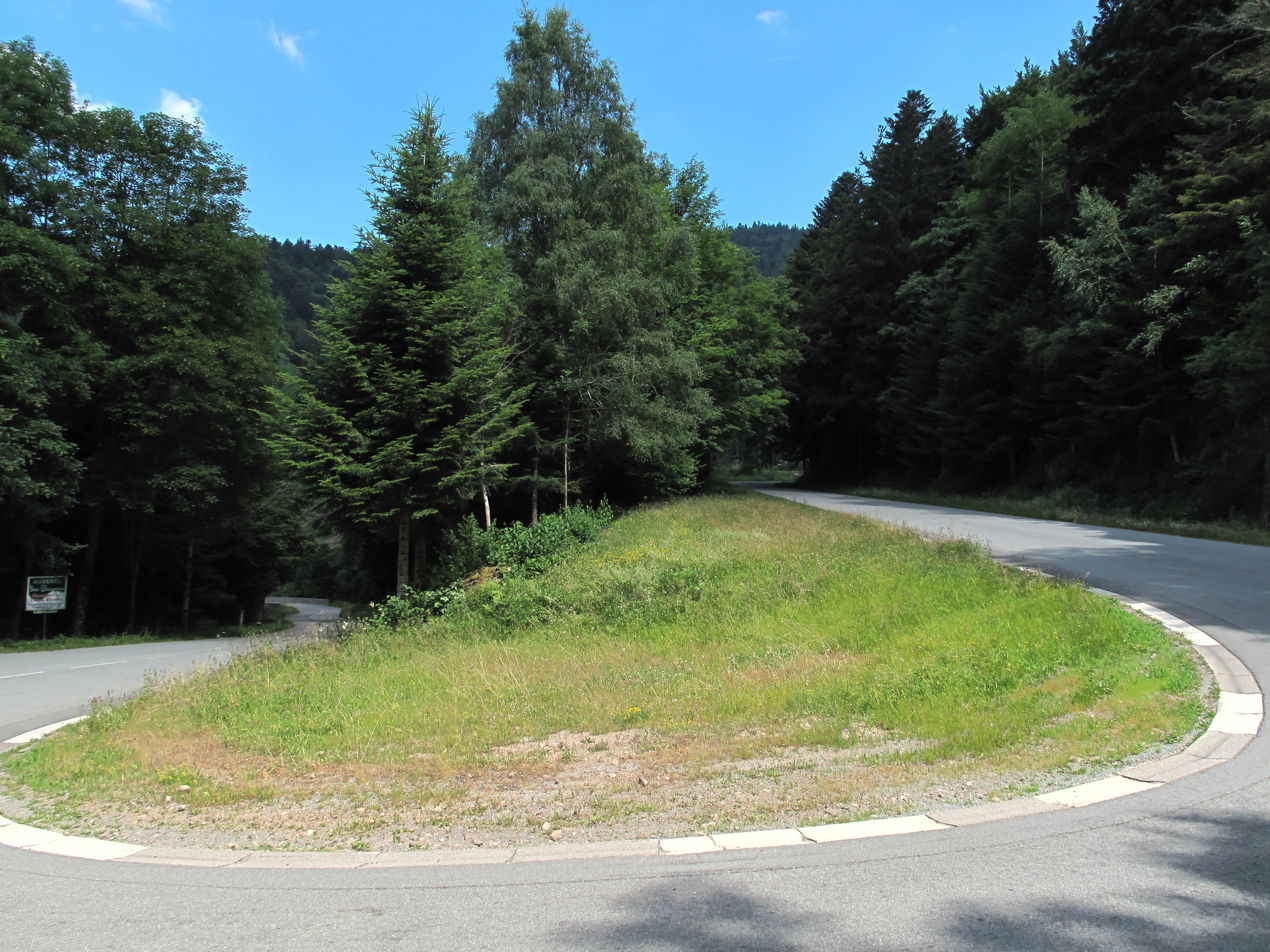
between Lepuix and Ballon d'Alsace, hairpin turn

== See also ==
- Communes of the Territoire de Belfort department
