= Rougegoutte =

- Commune
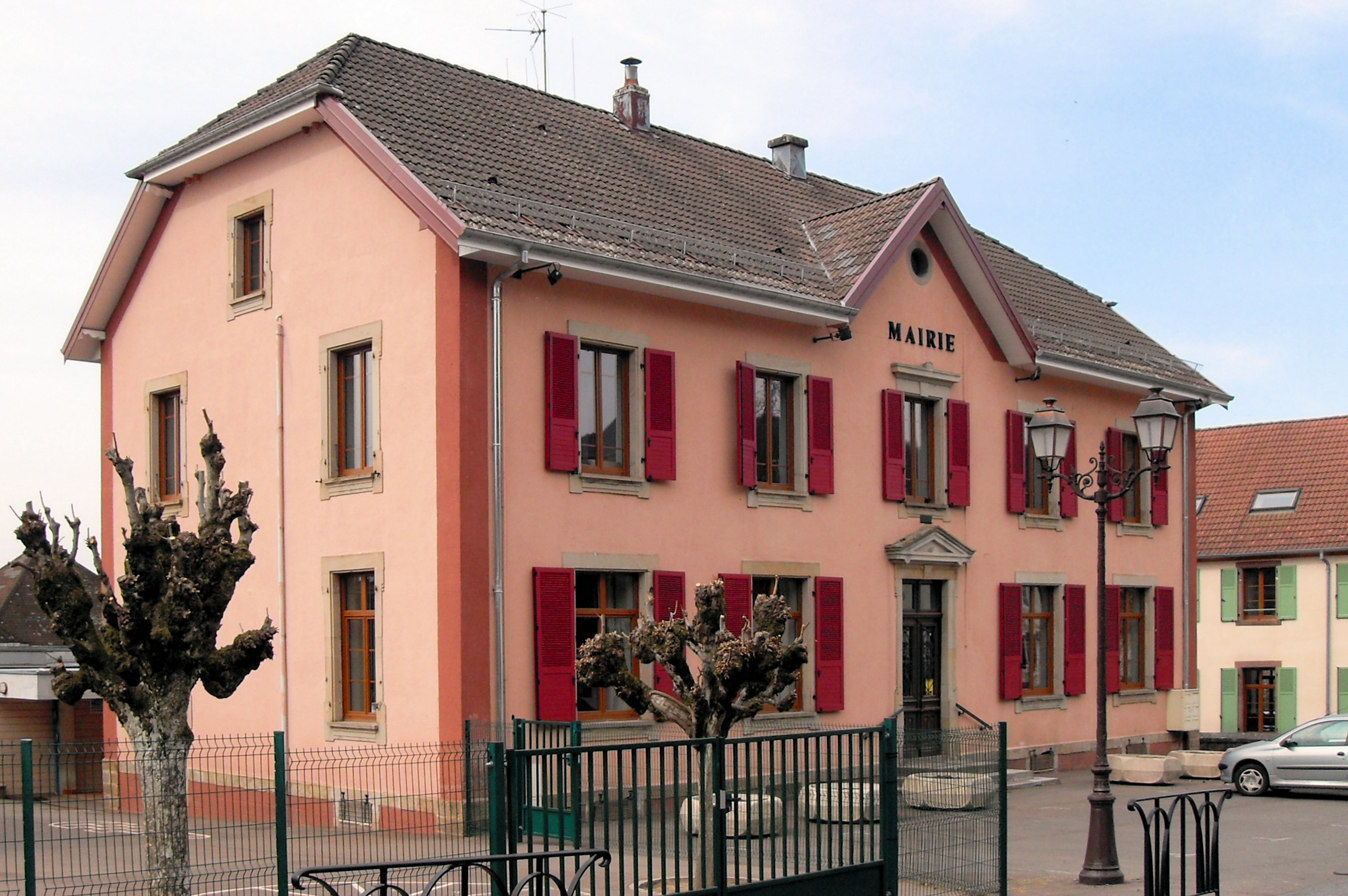
- Town hall

- Coat of arms
- Location of Rougegoutte
- Location within France Location within Bourgogne-Franche-Comté
- Coordinates: 47°43′56″N 6°51′04″E
- Country: France
- Region: Bourgogne-Franche-Comté
- Department: Territoire de Belfort
- Arrondissement: Belfort
- Canton: Giromagny

Government
  - Mayor (2020–2026): Guy Miclo
- Area^{1}: 8.07 km^{2} (3.12 sq mi)
- Highest elevation: 910 m (2,990 ft)
- Lowest elevation: 425 m (1,394 ft)
- Population (2023): 987
  - Density: 122/km^{2} (317/sq mi)
- Time zone: UTC+01:00 (CET)
  - Summer (DST): UTC+02:00 (CEST)
- INSEE/Postal code: 90088 /90200
- ^{1} French Land Register data, which excludes lakes, ponds, glaciers > 1 km^{2} (0.386 sq mi or 247 acres) and river estuaries.

Rougegoutte (French pronunciation: [ʁuʒɡut]) is a commune in the Territoire de Belfort department in Bourgogne-Franche-Comté in northeastern France.

== See also ==
- Communes of the Territoire de Belfort department
