= Vadencourt =

Vadencourt may refer to either of two communes in France:

- Vadencourt, Aisne
- Vadencourt, Somme
