= Lamadeleine-Val-des-Anges =

- Commune
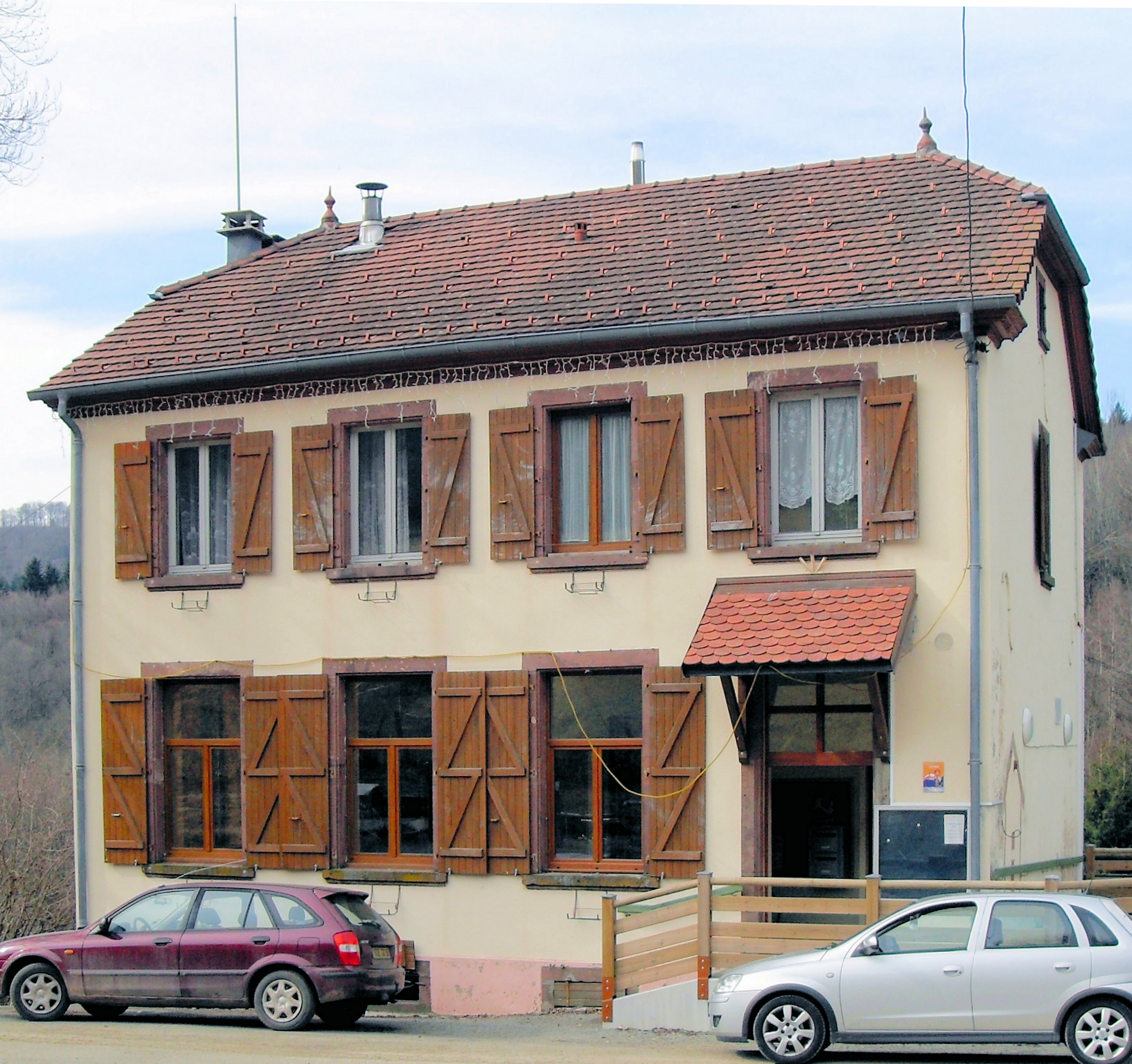
- Town hall

- Coat of arms
- Location of Lamadeleine-Val-des-Anges
- Location within France Location within Bourgogne-Franche-Comté
- Coordinates: 47°45′43″N 6°54′50″E
- Country: France
- Region: Bourgogne-Franche-Comté
- Department: Territoire de Belfort
- Arrondissement: Belfort
- Canton: Giromagny
- Intercommunality: CC Vosges du Sud

Government
  - Mayor (2021–2026): Olivier Bazin
- Area^{1}: 6.52 km^{2} (2.52 sq mi)
- Highest elevation: 1,075 m (3,527 ft)
- Lowest elevation: 537 m (1,762 ft)
- Population (2023): 46
  - Density: 7.1/km^{2} (18/sq mi)
- Time zone: UTC+01:00 (CET)
  - Summer (DST): UTC+02:00 (CEST)
- INSEE/Postal code: 90061 /90170
- ^{1} French Land Register data, which excludes lakes, ponds, glaciers > 1 km^{2} (0.386 sq mi or 247 acres) and river estuaries.

Lamadeleine-Val-des-Anges (French pronunciation: [lamadlɛn valde.z‿ɑ̃ʒ]) is a commune in the Territoire de Belfort department in Bourgogne-Franche-Comté in northeastern France.

== See also ==
- Communes of the Territoire de Belfort department
