= Petitefontaine =

- Commune
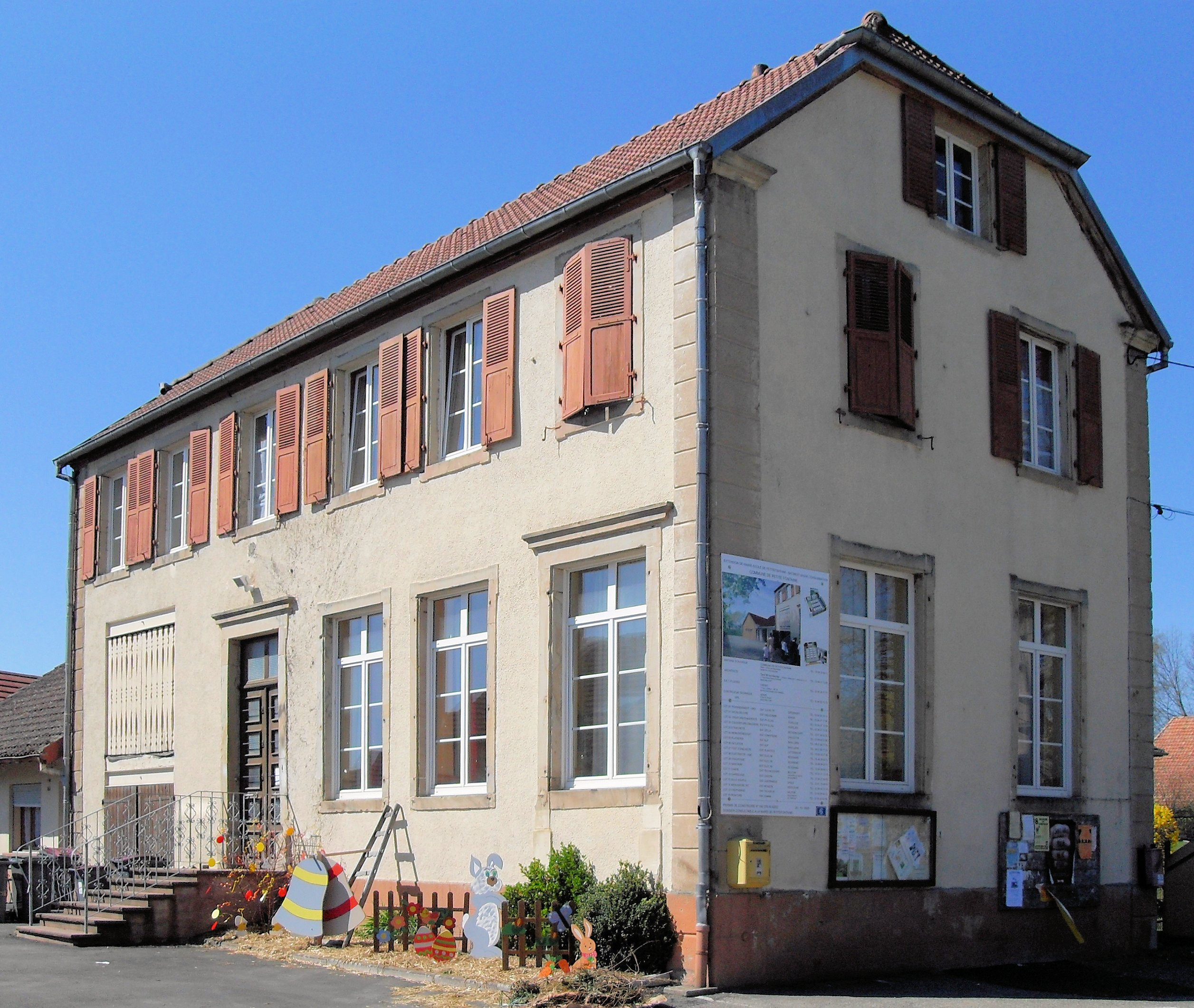
- Town hall

- Coat of arms
- Location of Petitefontaine
- Location within France Location within Bourgogne-Franche-Comté
- Coordinates: 47°43′20″N 7°00′30″E
- Country: France
- Region: Bourgogne-Franche-Comté
- Department: Territoire de Belfort
- Arrondissement: Belfort
- Canton: Giromagny

Government
  - Mayor (2020–2026): Luc Affholder
- Area^{1}: 3.13 km^{2} (1.21 sq mi)
- Highest elevation: 412 m (1,352 ft)
- Lowest elevation: 383 m (1,257 ft)
- Population (2023): 193
  - Density: 61.7/km^{2} (160/sq mi)
- Time zone: UTC+01:00 (CET)
  - Summer (DST): UTC+02:00 (CEST)
- INSEE/Postal code: 90078 /90360
- ^{1} French Land Register data, which excludes lakes, ponds, glaciers > 1 km^{2} (0.386 sq mi or 247 acres) and river estuaries.

Petitefontaine (French pronunciation: [pətitfɔ̃tɛn], before 1962: La Petite-Fontaine) is a commune in the Territoire de Belfort department in Bourgogne-Franche-Comté in northeastern France.

== See also ==
- Communes of the Territoire de Belfort department
