= Grosmagny =

- Commune
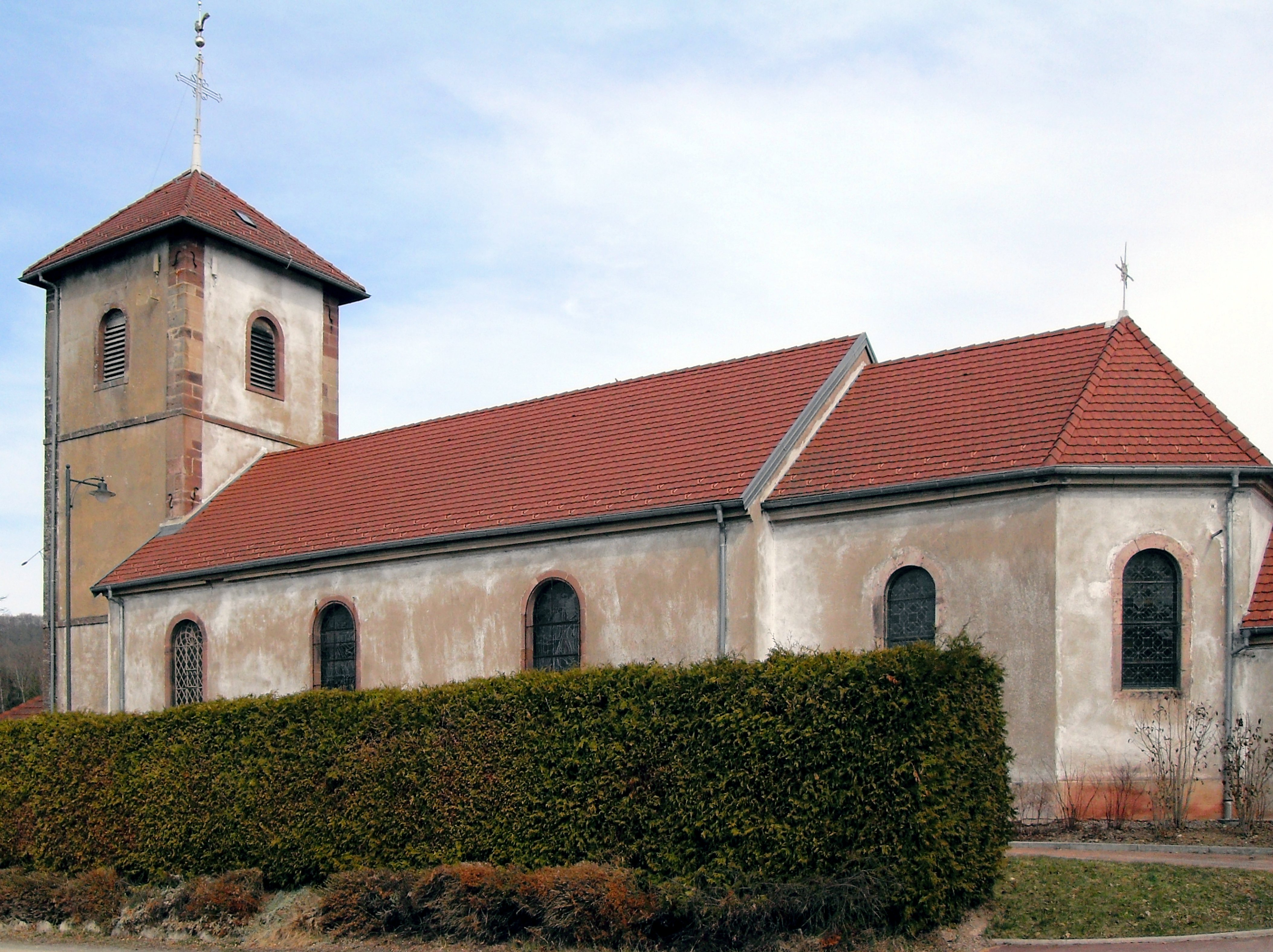
- Saint Georges Church

- Coat of arms
- Location of Grosmagny
- Location within France Location within Bourgogne-Franche-Comté
- Coordinates: 47°43′23″N 6°53′04″E
- Country: France
- Region: Bourgogne-Franche-Comté
- Department: Territoire de Belfort
- Arrondissement: Belfort
- Canton: Giromagny
- Intercommunality: Vosges du Sud

Government
  - Mayor (2020–2026): Maurice Leguillon
- Area^{1}: 9.46 km^{2} (3.65 sq mi)
- Highest elevation: 915 m (3,002 ft)
- Lowest elevation: 401 m (1,316 ft)
- Population (2023): 569
  - Density: 60.1/km^{2} (156/sq mi)
- Time zone: UTC+01:00 (CET)
  - Summer (DST): UTC+02:00 (CEST)
- INSEE/Postal code: 90054 /90200
- ^{1} French Land Register data, which excludes lakes, ponds, glaciers > 1 km^{2} (0.386 sq mi or 247 acres) and river estuaries.

Grosmagny (French pronunciation: [ɡʁomaɲi]; German: Großmenglatt) is a commune in the Territoire de Belfort department in Bourgogne-Franche-Comté in northeastern France.

== See also ==
- Communes of the Territoire de Belfort department
