= Felon, Territoire de Belfort =

Felon
- Commune
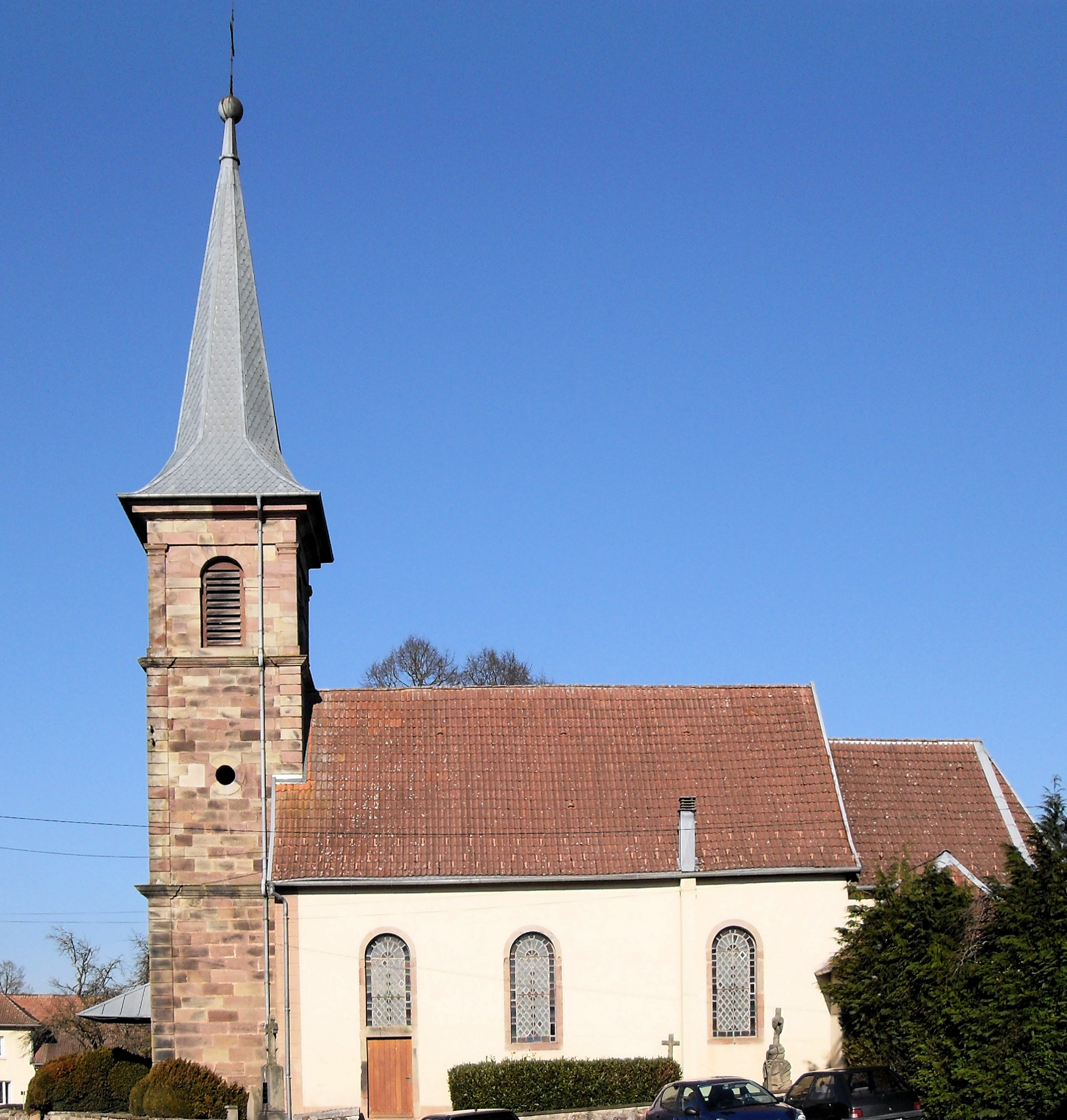
- Saint Antoine Church

- Coat of arms
- Location of Felon
- Location within France Location within Bourgogne-Franche-Comté
- Coordinates: 47°42′28″N 6°58′34″E
- Country: France
- Region: Bourgogne-Franche-Comté
- Department: Territoire de Belfort
- Arrondissement: Belfort
- Canton: Giromagny
- Intercommunality: Vosges du Sud

Government
  - Mayor (2022–2026): Eric Weiss
- Area^{1}: 4.11 km^{2} (1.59 sq mi)
- Highest elevation: 520 m (1,710 ft)
- Lowest elevation: 364 m (1,194 ft)
- Population (2023): 222
  - Density: 54.0/km^{2} (140/sq mi)
- Time zone: UTC+01:00 (CET)
  - Summer (DST): UTC+02:00 (CEST)
- INSEE/Postal code: 90044 /90110
- ^{1} French Land Register data, which excludes lakes, ponds, glaciers > 1 km^{2} (0.386 sq mi or 247 acres) and river estuaries.

Felon (French pronunciation: [fəlɔ̃]) is a commune in the Territoire de Belfort department in Bourgogne-Franche-Comté in northeastern France.

== Geography ==
Felon is situated on the southern slope of the Vosges, 15 km to the northeast of Belfort.

=== Climate ===
Felon has an oceanic climate (Köppen climate classification Cfb). The average annual temperature in Felon is 10.3 °C (50.5 °F). The average annual rainfall is 1,056.1 mm (41.58 in) with December as the wettest month. The temperatures are highest on average in July, at around 19.1 °C (66.4 °F), and lowest in January, at around 1.8 °C (35.2 °F). The highest temperature ever recorded in Felon was 38.0 °C (100.4 °F) on 7 August 2015; the coldest temperature ever recorded was −19.3 °C (−2.7 °F) on 20 December 2009.

Climate data for Felon (1991−2020 normals, extremes 2007−present)
Month	Jan	Feb	Mar	Apr	May	Jun	Jul	Aug	Sep	Oct	Nov	Dec	Year
Record high °C (°F)	16.0 (60.8)	22.1 (71.8)	24.7 (76.5)	27.8 (82.0)	33.0 (91.4)	35.1 (95.2)	37.3 (99.1)	38.0 (100.4)	32.0 (89.6)	27.8 (82.0)	23.0 (73.4)	17.7 (63.9)	38.0 (100.4)
Mean daily maximum °C (°F)	4.8 (40.6)	6.5 (43.7)	11.0 (51.8)	16.1 (61.0)	19.4 (66.9)	23.4 (74.1)	25.4 (77.7)	25.1 (77.2)	20.9 (69.6)	15.3 (59.5)	9.4 (48.9)	5.9 (42.6)	15.3 (59.5)
Daily mean °C (°F)	1.8 (35.2)	2.6 (36.7)	6.0 (42.8)	10.0 (50.0)	13.5 (56.3)	17.4 (63.3)	19.1 (66.4)	18.8 (65.8)	14.8 (58.6)	10.5 (50.9)	5.9 (42.6)	2.7 (36.9)	10.3 (50.5)
Mean daily minimum °C (°F)	−1.2 (29.8)	−1.2 (29.8)	0.9 (33.6)	4.0 (39.2)	7.5 (45.5)	11.3 (52.3)	12.7 (54.9)	12.4 (54.3)	8.8 (47.8)	5.7 (42.3)	2.4 (36.3)	−0.5 (31.1)	5.2 (41.4)
Record low °C (°F)	−15.1 (4.8)	−14.8 (5.4)	−11.7 (10.9)	−5.9 (21.4)	−2.5 (27.5)	3.1 (37.6)	4.0 (39.2)	2.7 (36.9)	0.7 (33.3)	−5.5 (22.1)	−11.5 (11.3)	−19.3 (−2.7)	−19.3 (−2.7)
Average precipitation mm (inches)	112.5 (4.43)	77.5 (3.05)	84.0 (3.31)	63.4 (2.50)	92.1 (3.63)	92.9 (3.66)	76.2 (3.00)	90.0 (3.54)	64.0 (2.52)	78.7 (3.10)	94.6 (3.72)	130.2 (5.13)	1,056.1 (41.58)
Average precipitation days (≥ 1.0 mm)	12.5	10.5	11.0	8.8	12.6	11.0	9.8	9.7	8.1	10.9	11.5	13.6	130.1
Source: Météo-France

== See also ==
- Communes of the Territoire de Belfort department
