= Étueffont =

- Commune
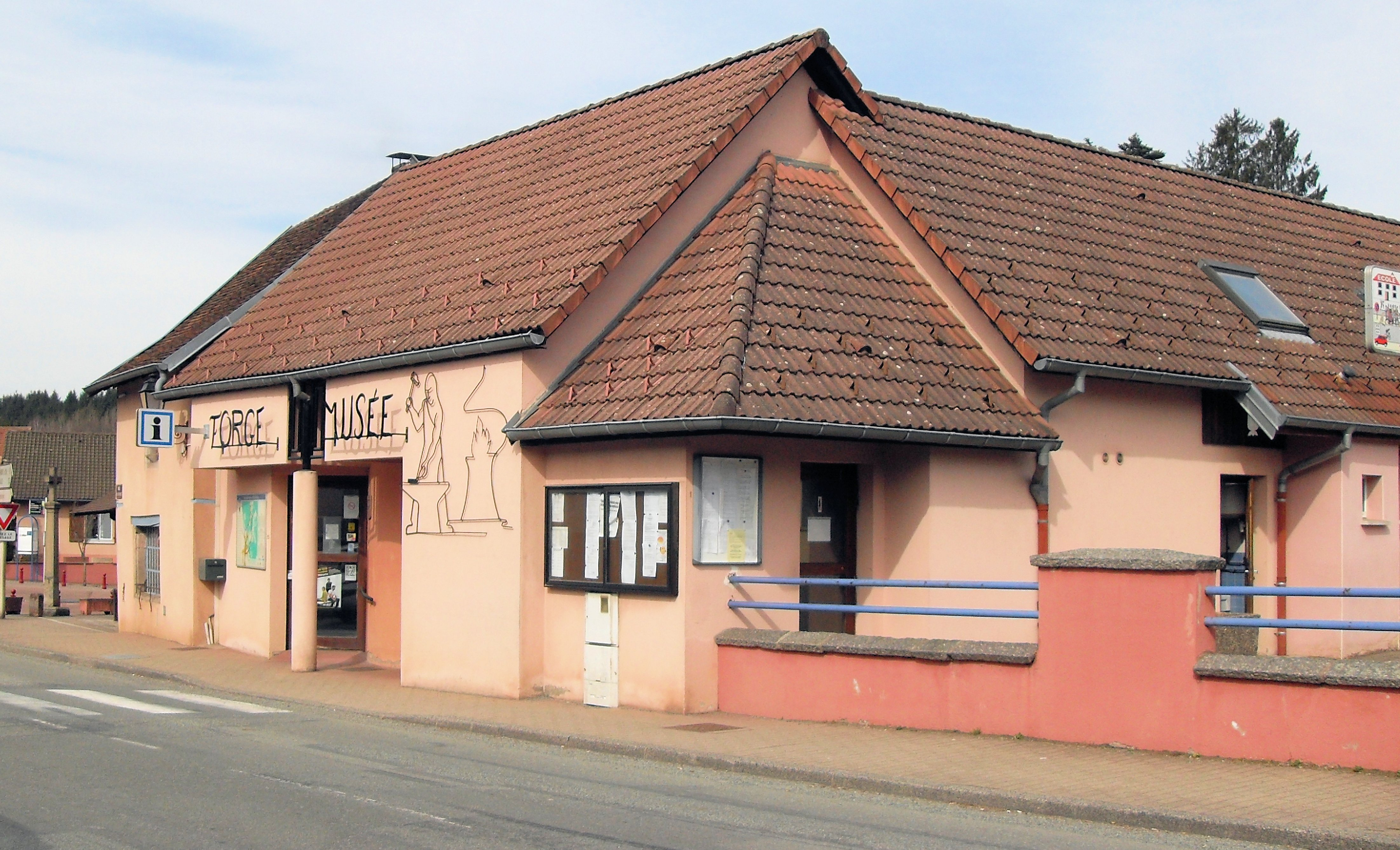
- Forge Museum

- Coat of arms
- Location of Étueffont
- Location within France Location within Bourgogne-Franche-Comté
- Coordinates: 47°43′11″N 6°55′21″E
- Country: France
- Region: Bourgogne-Franche-Comté
- Department: Territoire de Belfort
- Arrondissement: Belfort
- Canton: Giromagny
- Intercommunality: Vosges du Sud

Government
  - Mayor (2020–2026): Alain Fessler
- Area^{1}: 12.53 km^{2} (4.84 sq mi)
- Highest elevation: 915 m (3,002 ft)
- Lowest elevation: 399 m (1,309 ft)
- Population (2023): 1,393
  - Density: 111.2/km^{2} (287.9/sq mi)
- Time zone: UTC+01:00 (CET)
  - Summer (DST): UTC+02:00 (CEST)
- INSEE/Postal code: 90041 /90170
- ^{1} French Land Register data, which excludes lakes, ponds, glaciers > 1 km^{2} (0.386 sq mi or 247 acres) and river estuaries.

Étueffont (French pronunciation: [etyfɔ̃]; German: Staufen) is a commune in the Territoire de Belfort department in Bourgogne-Franche-Comté in northeastern France.

== History ==
The separate villages of Étueffont-Bas (founded in the 16th century, with 28 families in 1760) and Étueffont-Haut (founded in the 12th century, with 38 families in 1760) were merged into the current commune on 12 June 1973.

== Geography ==
The town sits at the foot of the Vosges mountains on the banks of the river Madeleine, in the Regional Natural Park Les Ballons des Vosges.

== Sights ==
In the village center an 18th-century smithy houses a Forge Museum that commemorates four generations of blacksmiths working in the village from 1843 to 1977.

== See also ==
- Communes of the Territoire de Belfort department
