= Anjoutey =

- Commune
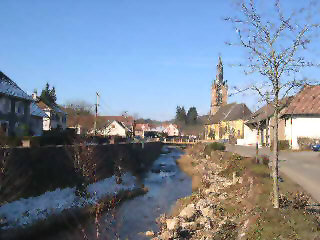
- The Madeleine

- Coat of arms
- Location of Anjoutey
- Location within France Location within Bourgogne-Franche-Comté
- Coordinates: 47°42′06″N 6°55′59″E
- Country: France
- Region: Bourgogne-Franche-Comté
- Department: Territoire de Belfort
- Arrondissement: Belfort
- Canton: Giromagny
- Intercommunality: CC Vosges du Sud

Government
  - Mayor (2020–2026): Jean-Pierre Bringard
- Area^{1}: 7.69 km^{2} (2.97 sq mi)
- Highest elevation: 505 m (1,657 ft)
- Lowest elevation: 372 m (1,220 ft)
- Population (2023): 611
  - Density: 79.5/km^{2} (206/sq mi)
- Time zone: UTC+01:00 (CET)
  - Summer (DST): UTC+02:00 (CEST)
- INSEE/Postal code: 90003 /90170
- ^{1} French Land Register data, which excludes lakes, ponds, glaciers > 1 km^{2} (0.386 sq mi or 247 acres) and river estuaries.

Anjoutey (French pronunciation: [ɑ̃ʒutɛ]) is a commune in the Territoire de Belfort department in Bourgogne-Franche-Comté in northeastern France.

== See also ==
- Communes of the Territoire de Belfort department
