= Auxelles-Haut =

- Commune
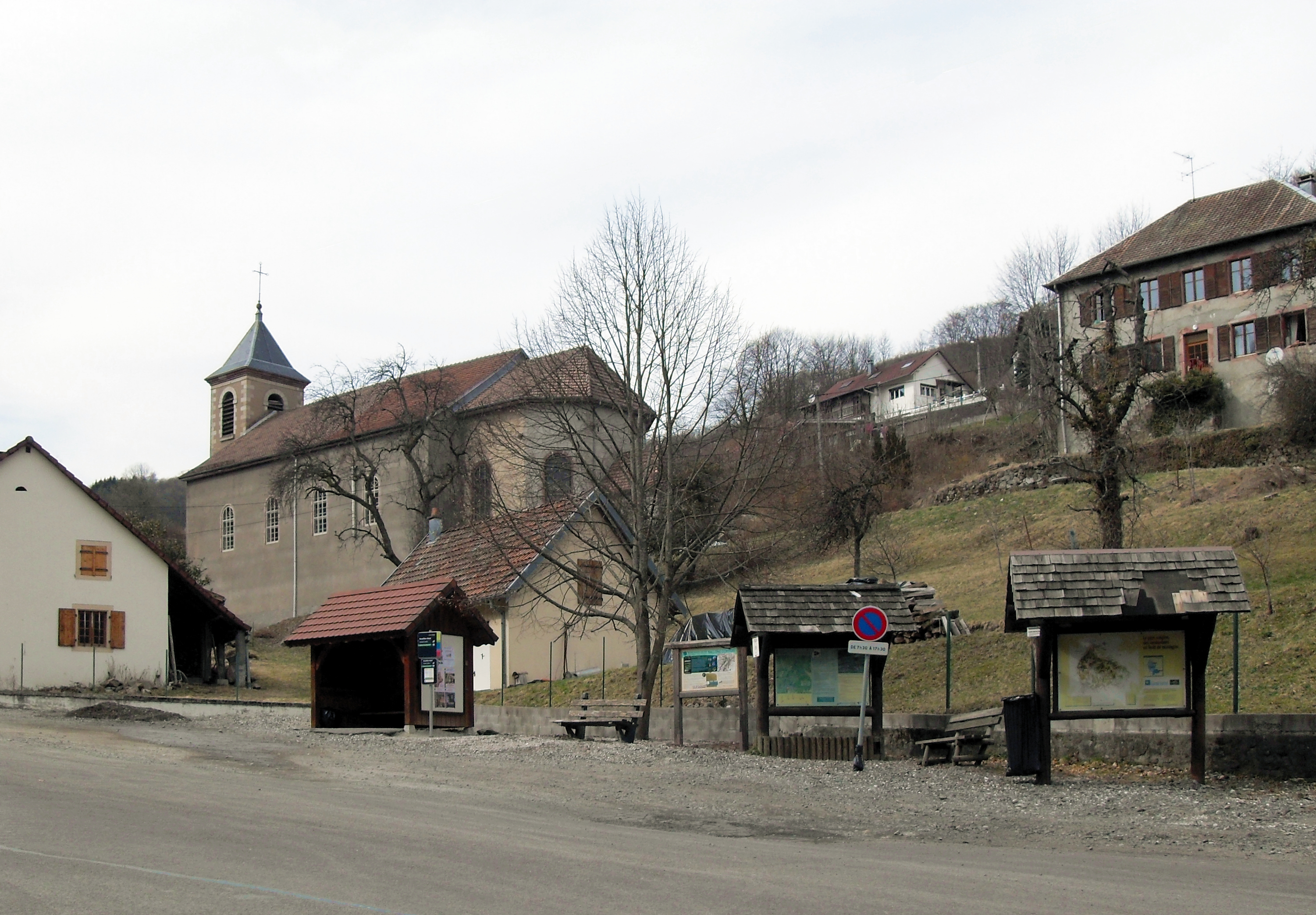
- The church of Notre-Dame-Auxiliatric, in Auxelles-Haut

- Coat of arms
- Location of Auxelles-Haut
- Location within France Location within Bourgogne-Franche-Comté
- Coordinates: 47°44′38″N 6°46′26″E
- Country: France
- Region: Bourgogne-Franche-Comté
- Department: Territoire de Belfort
- Arrondissement: Belfort
- Canton: Giromagny
- Intercommunality: CC Vosges Sud

Government
  - Mayor (2020–2026): Arnaud Ziegler
- Area^{1}: 6.48 km^{2} (2.50 sq mi)
- Highest elevation: 1,140 m (3,740 ft)
- Lowest elevation: 510 m (1,670 ft)
- Population (2023): 287
  - Density: 44.3/km^{2} (115/sq mi)
- Time zone: UTC+01:00 (CET)
  - Summer (DST): UTC+02:00 (CEST)
- INSEE/Postal code: 90006 /90200
- ^{1} French Land Register data, which excludes lakes, ponds, glaciers > 1 km^{2} (0.386 sq mi or 247 acres) and river estuaries.

Auxelles-Haut (French pronunciation: [oksɛl o]; German: Oberassel) is a commune in the Territoire de Belfort department in Bourgogne-Franche-Comté in northeastern France.

== See also ==
- Communes of the Territoire de Belfort department
