= Lachapelle-sous-Chaux =

- Commune
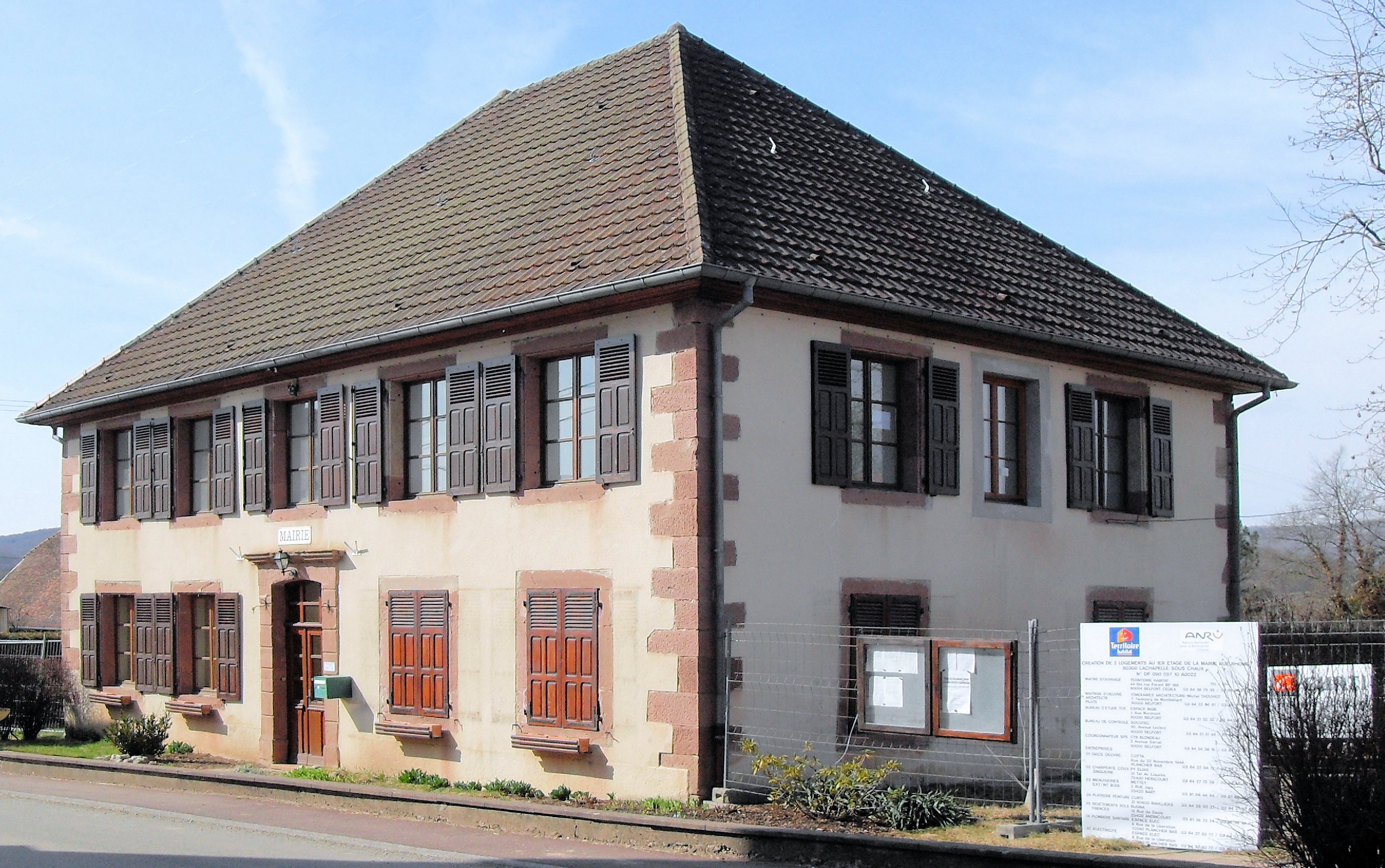
- Town hall
- Location of Lachapelle-sous-Chaux
- Location within France Location within Bourgogne-Franche-Comté
- Coordinates: 47°42′19″N 6°49′19″E
- Country: France
- Region: Bourgogne-Franche-Comté
- Department: Territoire de Belfort
- Arrondissement: Belfort
- Canton: Giromagny
- Intercommunality: Vosges du Sud

Government
  - Mayor (2020–2026): Anne-Sophie Peureux-Demangelle
- Area^{1}: 11.16 km^{2} (4.31 sq mi)
- Highest elevation: 605 m (1,985 ft)
- Lowest elevation: 392 m (1,286 ft)
- Population (2023): 745
  - Density: 66.8/km^{2} (173/sq mi)
- Time zone: UTC+01:00 (CET)
  - Summer (DST): UTC+02:00 (CEST)
- INSEE/Postal code: 90057 /90300
- ^{1} French Land Register data, which excludes lakes, ponds, glaciers > 1 km^{2} (0.386 sq mi or 247 acres) and river estuaries.

Lachapelle-sous-Chaux (French pronunciation: [laʃapɛl su ʃo]; German: Kappeltscha) is a commune in the Territoire de Belfort department in Bourgogne-Franche-Comté in northeastern France.

== See also ==
- Communes of the Territoire de Belfort department
