= Auxelles-Bas =

- Commune
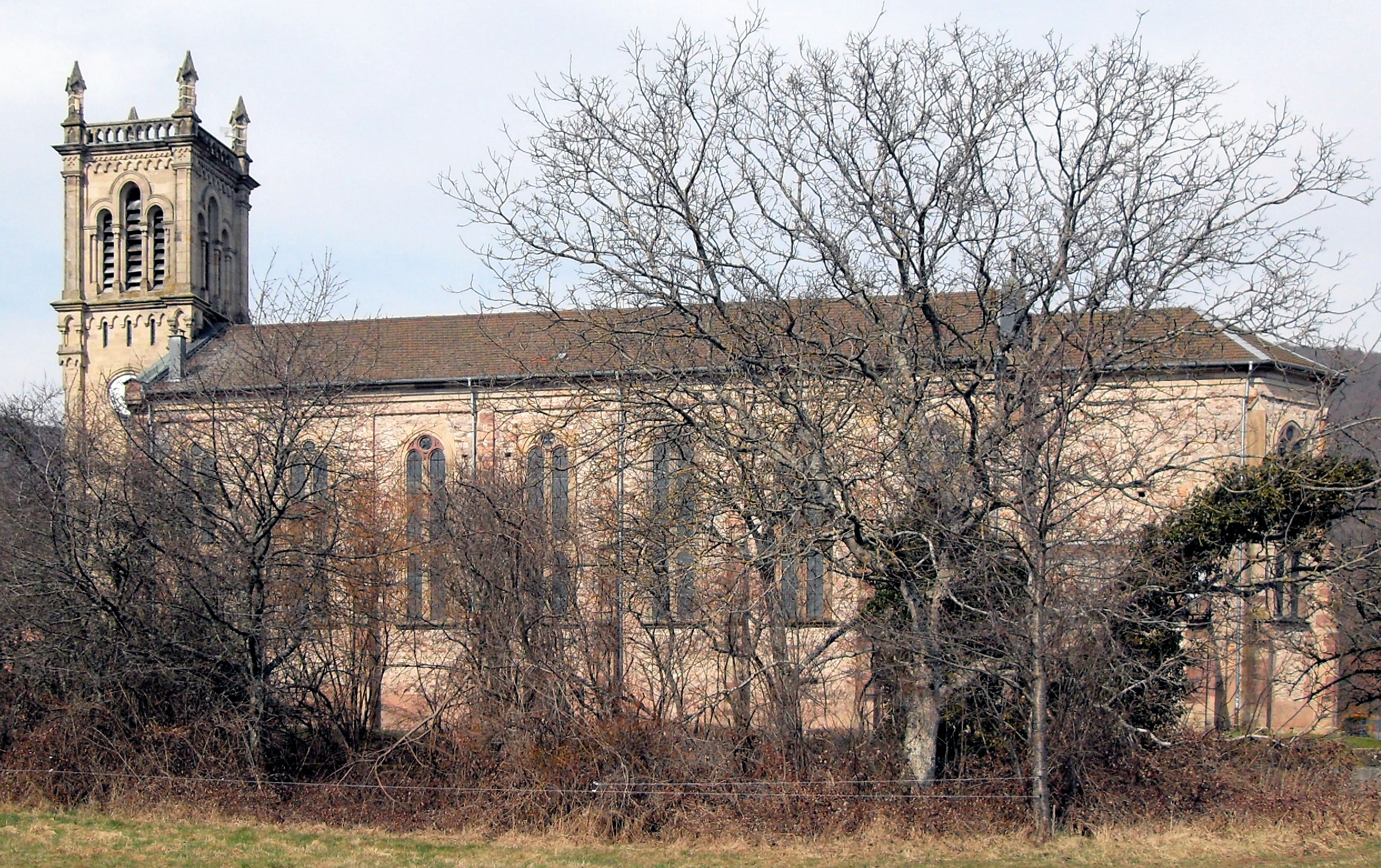
- Sainte-Catherine church

- Coat of arms
- Location of Auxelles-Bas
- Location within France Location within Bourgogne-Franche-Comté
- Coordinates: 47°44′06″N 6°46′52″E
- Country: France
- Region: Bourgogne-Franche-Comté
- Department: Territoire de Belfort
- Arrondissement: Belfort
- Canton: Giromagny
- Intercommunality: CC Vosges Sud

Government
  - Mayor (2020–2026): Jonathan Grosclaude
- Area^{1}: 9.41 km^{2} (3.63 sq mi)
- Highest elevation: 621 m (2,037 ft)
- Lowest elevation: 430 m (1,410 ft)
- Population (2023): 417
  - Density: 44.3/km^{2} (115/sq mi)
- Time zone: UTC+01:00 (CET)
  - Summer (DST): UTC+02:00 (CEST)
- INSEE/Postal code: 90005 /90200
- ^{1} French Land Register data, which excludes lakes, ponds, glaciers > 1 km^{2} (0.386 sq mi or 247 acres) and river estuaries.

Auxelles-Bas (French pronunciation: [oksɛl ba]; German: Niederassel) is a commune in the Territoire de Belfort department in Bourgogne-Franche-Comté in northeastern France.

== Population ==
Historical population
Year	Pop.	±% p.a.
1968	283	—
1975	325	+2.00%
1982	361	+1.51%
1990	353	−0.28%
1999	461	+3.01%
2007	474	+0.35%
2012	486	+0.50%
2017	463	−0.96%
2023	417	−1.73%
Source: INSEE

== See also ==
- Fort de Giromagny
- Communes of the Territoire de Belfort department
