= Rougemont-le-Château =

- Commune
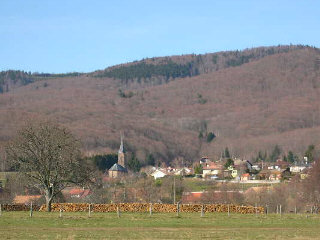
- Village overview

- Coat of arms
- Location of Rougemont-le-Château
- Location within France Location within Bourgogne-Franche-Comté
- Coordinates: 47°44′08″N 6°58′02″E
- Country: France
- Region: Bourgogne-Franche-Comté
- Department: Territoire de Belfort
- Arrondissement: Belfort
- Canton: Giromagny

Government
  - Mayor (2020–2026): Didier Vallverdu
- Area^{1}: 16.64 km^{2} (6.42 sq mi)
- Highest elevation: 1,031 m (3,383 ft)
- Lowest elevation: 422 m (1,385 ft)
- Population (2023): 1,487
  - Density: 89.36/km^{2} (231.4/sq mi)
- Time zone: UTC+01:00 (CET)
  - Summer (DST): UTC+02:00 (CEST)
- INSEE/Postal code: 90089 /90110
- ^{1} French Land Register data, which excludes lakes, ponds, glaciers > 1 km^{2} (0.386 sq mi or 247 acres) and river estuaries.

Rougemont-le-Château (French pronunciation: [ʁuʒmɔ̃ lə ʃɑto]) is a commune in the Territoire de Belfort département in Bourgogne-Franche-Comté in northeastern France.

== Sights and monuments ==
- Château de Rougemont, ruined 12th century castle
- Chapelle Sainte-Catherine, near the castle ruins

== See also ==
- Communes of the Territoire de Belfort department
