= Fortified region of Belfort =

First line of defense in the Séré de Rivières system - Belfort Gap fortifications

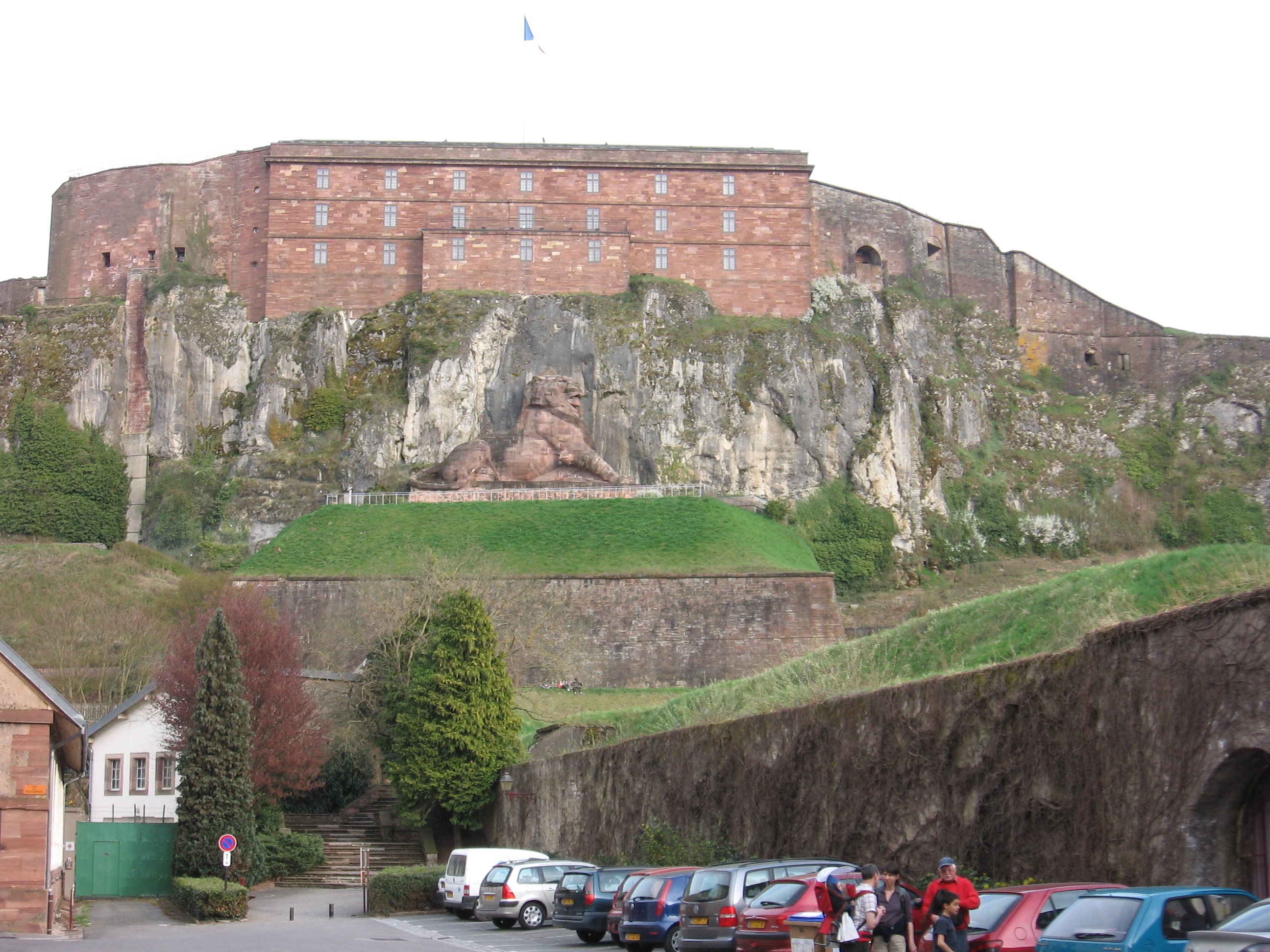
The Lion of Belfort, symbolic of the defense of Belfort in 1870–71, with the citadel behind

The fortified region of Belfort (place fortifiée de Belfort) formed the first line of defense in the Séré de Rivières system of fortifications in the Belfort Gap. Located in northeastern France between Épinal and Besançon, the primary line was built in the late 19th century to deal with advances in artillery that had made older defensive systems obsolete.

== History ==
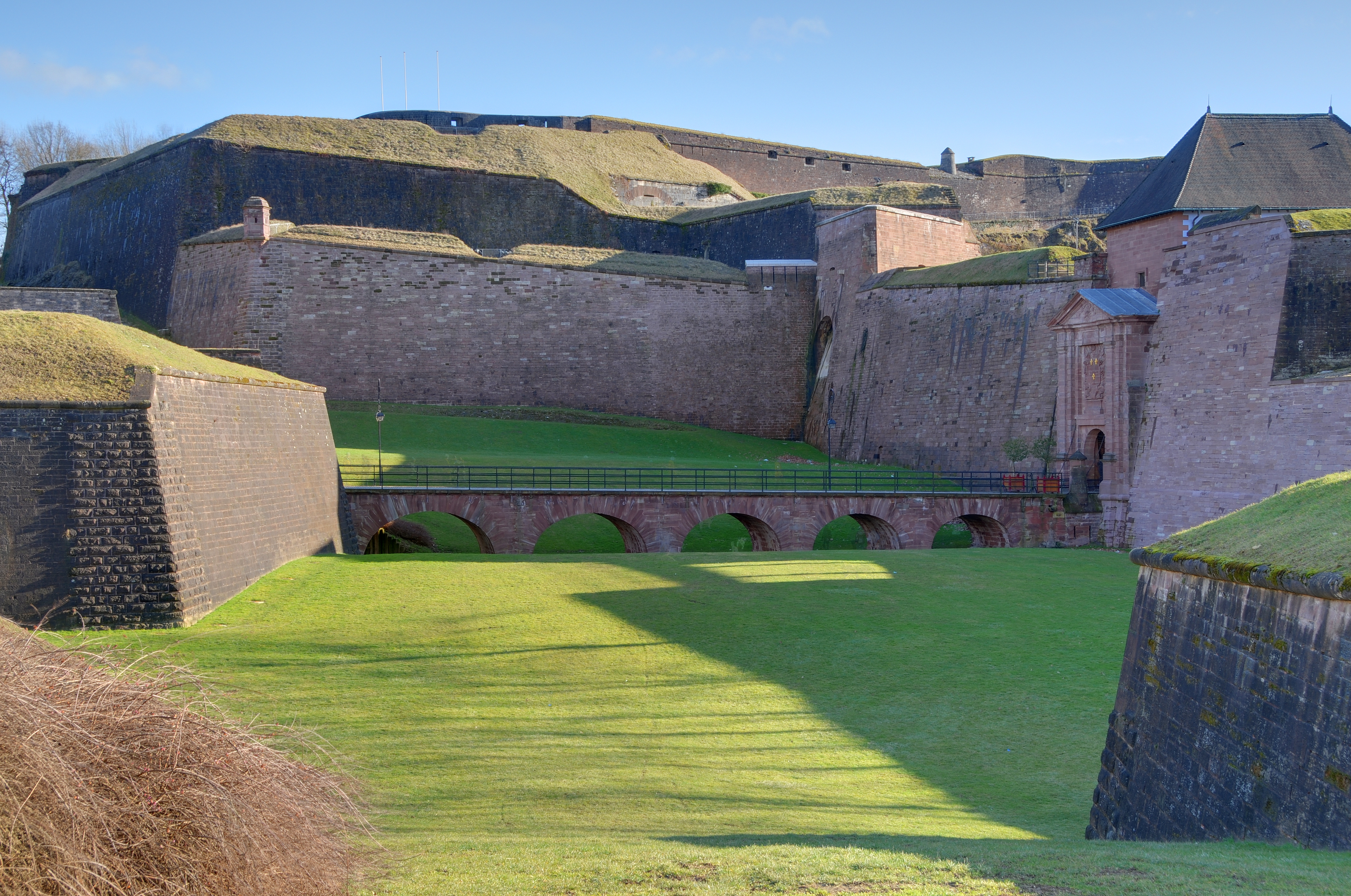
Vauban's citadel in Belfort.

Belfort has been a fortified place since the Middle Ages, when a castle was built in 1226. After withstanding seven sieges, the medieval fortifications were modernized between 1637 and 1648 by the Comte de la Suze. Vauban added hornworks and a barracks to the castle and enclosed the city in a new wall according to Vauban's "second system", which resisted a siege in 1815.

As armies made greater use of artillery, it became necessary to extend city defenses to keep opponents sufficiently distant to prevent bombardment of the city from neighboring high ground. The first ring of forts was built at the direction of General Baron Haxo, beginning in 1817. The forts of La Miotte, La Justice and the Le Vallon camp were built and the city walls were improved. Further increases in the range of artillery caused the construction of more forts to the south and east, resulting in Fort Bellevue, Fort des Barres and the Forts des Perches. These forts formed a rough ring about 1,200 to 1,500 m (3,900 to 4,900 ft) from the town walls which resisted attack in 1870–71.

Shortly after the French defeat in the Franco-Prussian War of 1870–1871, Belfort, an important road and railway node and the frontier cities of Épinal, Toul and Verdun were chosen to constitute the first line of defense against an invasion from the annexed French provinces of Alsace and Lorraine. The fortifications were part of an extensive network of new forts proposed and carried out by Raymond Adolphe Séré de Rivières. The fortified region of Belfort runs between Fort de Giromagny, part of the High Moselle line and Fort Lachaux of the defensive network of Lomont. The object of the program was to transform the Belfort area into a fortified camp.

The fortified camp concept concentrates artillery into permanent forts built around the city, with distances calculated to place enemy artillery out of range of the city, while allowing for mutual support between forts. At the end of the 19th century the fortified camp of Belfort included the original fortified belt built between 1793 and 1870 and the Séré de Rivières forts built between 1874 and 1886, with numerous smaller batteries.

== Inter-war ==
Following the First World War, French defense policy was re-examined by Marshal Philippe Pétain. The 1919 study recommended the creation of a mobile army that could carry war to the territory of an opponent, supported by frontier defenses that would prevent an opponent from penetrating French territory. The second part of the recommendation was to involve the creation of fortified regions (regions fortifiés) in which an opponent could be confronted; the recommended fortified regions included

- The Rhine frontier, with two fortified regions, one to the south of Mulhouse and a northern region defending the Alsace plain to the frontier on the Lauter.
- An area to the west of the Rhine to prevent an incursion across the land frontier with Germany onto the Alsace plain.
- An area in Lorraine to defend the coal-mining regions in the Sarre basin

The regions were to provide locations in which to confront an opponent and from which to launch an offensive to carry the battle to the opponent. The fortifications of the Séré de Rivières system of the 1880s were designed to defend the new eastern frontier following the Franco-Prussian War. With the recovery of these territories following World War I, most of the Séré de Rivières forts were deep in the interior of north-eastern France and not useful. The Belfort region had remained in French hands and had been fortified already.

A new région fortifiée de Belfort (RFB) was again proposed in 1922 by the Territorial Defense Commission (commission de défense du territoire), which identified three potential invasion routes from Germany, the Belfort Gap, between the Vosges Mountains and the Rhine and across the Lorraine plateau The committee's final report proposed a continuous fortification from the Swiss border north to the Lauter and west to Longwy, with the area of the Sarre, which faced the demilitarized area of the Saarland, left unfortified. The final report recommended three fortified regions

- The Fortified Region of Metz-Thionville-Longwy
- The Fortified Region of the Lauter
- The Fortified Region of Belfort

The report did not make specific recommendations on the location or character of the defenses. The Commission on Defense of the Frontiers (commission de défense des frontiers) was established on 31 December 1935 by Prime Minister Paul Painlevé, to once again consider the question of the frontiers. The commissioned was charged with making recommendations for defenses and for the incorporation of the existing defenses of Metz and Belfort. The report recommended the creation of a line of defenses about 25 km (16 mi) to the east of Belfort, with heavier fortifications to the north and lighter positions to the south. A second line 12 km (7.5 mi) to the rear was to be constructed after a mobilization of the army. The forts at Giromagny, Mont Bart and Chaux were to support the fortification lines with artillery.

=== World War II ===
In the 1930s, several forts were included in the eastern extension of the Maginot Line fortifications along the line of the Rhine. While not officially part of the new Maginot defenses, the older positions were integrated into the fortress unit command structure of the French army and were designated the région fortifiée de Belfort, with rough equivalence to an army corps. A more ambitious 1926 plan proposed more extensive improvements, although still short of Maginot standards. In practice, a few positions were improved and some new blockhouses were built in the spaces between the forts. The région fortifiée de Belfort was under the command of the Eighth Army, Army Group 3 in 1940, with subordinate sectors including the Defensive Sector of Montbéliard, Defensive Sector of Altkirch and the Fortified Sector of the Jura. The RFB became the 44th Fortress Corps (CAF) from 16 March 1940, losing the Jura sector to the 45th CAF.

== Forts ==
=== Citadel ===
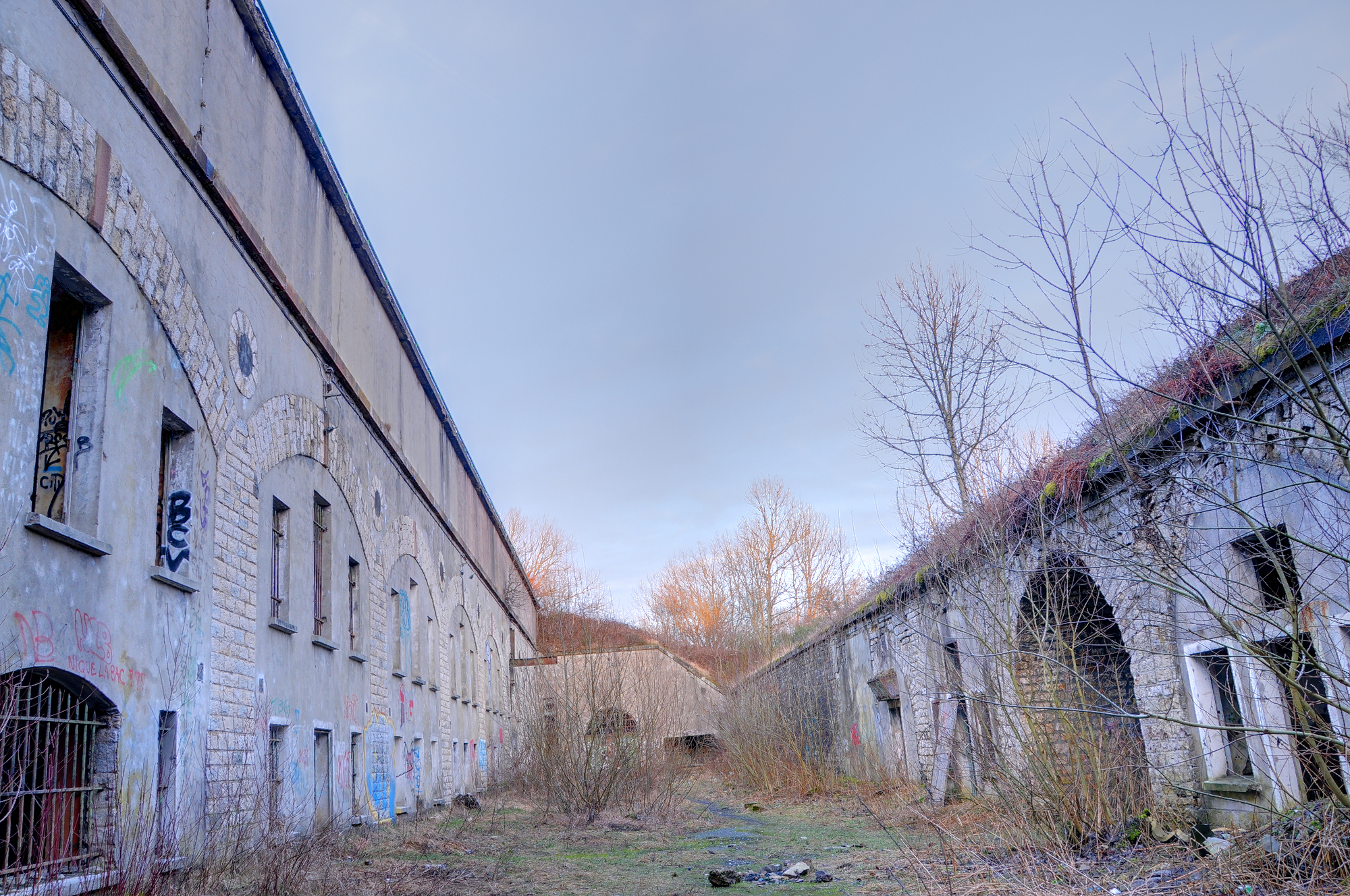
Fort du Salbert (Photo:Bresson Thomas)

- Citadel of Belfort, built and expanded in stages from the Middle Ages, eventually mounting 100 artillery pieces. The citadel was the command post for the Belfort fortifications until 1940.

=== Forts built 1792–1870 ===
- Fort de la Miotte (17..–1835), also known as Fort Kléber
- Vallon rampart (1831–1842) connecting Miotte and la Justice, blocking the Alsace road and forming a place of refuge and assembly for a field army.
- Fort de la Justice (17..-1842), also known as Fort Lecourbe
- Fort des Hautes Perches (1815–1870)
- Fort des Basses Perches (1815–1870)
- Fort Bellevue (1870) – Fort demolished at the beginning of the 20th century
- Fort des Barres (1865–1870), also known as Fort Hatry

=== Séré de Rivières forts 1874–1886 ===
- Fort du Salbert (1874–1877), also known as Fort Lefebvre, located in Belfort at an elevation of 650 meters, the highest of the forts. It was later known as Ouvrage G and Station Maître Radar 60/921, part of the French military radar surveillance network.
- Fort de Roppe (1875–1877), also known as Fort Ney, in the commune of Roppe.
- Fort de Bessoncourt (1883–1886)
- Fort de Vézelois (1883–1886), also known as Fort Ordener, located between the communes of Meroux and Vézelois.
- Fort du Bois d'Oye (1883–1886), also known as Fort Eblé, located in the commune of Bermont.
- Fort du Mont Vaudois (1874–1877), located in Valdoie.
- Fort des Hautes Perches (1874–1877) – Reconstruction of the fort first completed in 1870, located in the town of Pérouse.
- Fort des Basses Perches (1874–1877) – Reconstruction of the fort first completed in 1870, located in the commune of Danjoutin and Belfort.

The two Perches forts of the original belt were retained and rebuilt by Séré de Rivières, by reason of their strategic value during the final stage of the Siege of Belfort in 1870–71.

Following a decree by Minister of War Georges Boulanger in 1887, the military structures were renamed with more "glorious" names, preferably relating to local military events. The local people did not always adopt these new names. Most of the sites are derelict.

== Strategic railroad ==
The Chemins de fer stratégique du Territoire du Belfort served the belt of forts using a 600 mm (24 in) narrow-gauge railway according to the Péchot system, which was used for a number of similar military supply systems. Part of the system was considered permanent, while the Decauville line was easily dismantled; construction took place from 1889 to 1893. The trains transported materials, supplies, munitions and personnel, with traction by a Péchot-Bourdon steam engine. The principal forts relying on the railway were Roppe, Bessoncourt, Chévremont, Vézelois, Meroux, Bois d'Oye, Salbert, les Barres, the Forts des Perches and Mont-Vaudois.

== Bibliography ==
- Kauffmann, J. E. and Kaufmann, H. W. Fortress France: The Maginot Line and French Defenses in World War II, 2006. ISBN 0-275-98345-5
- Mary, Jean-Yves; Hohnadel, Alain; Sicard, Jacques. Hommes et Ouvrages de la Ligne Maginot, Tome 1. Paris, Histoire & Collections, 2001. ISBN 2-908182-88-2 (in French)
- Mary, Jean-Yves; Hohnadel, Alain; Sicard, Jacques. Hommes et Ouvrages de la Ligne Maginot, Tome 3. Paris, Histoire & Collections, 2003. ISBN 2-913903-88-6 (in French)
