= Fort des Hautes Perches =

- Part of Fortified region of Belfort
- Belfort, France
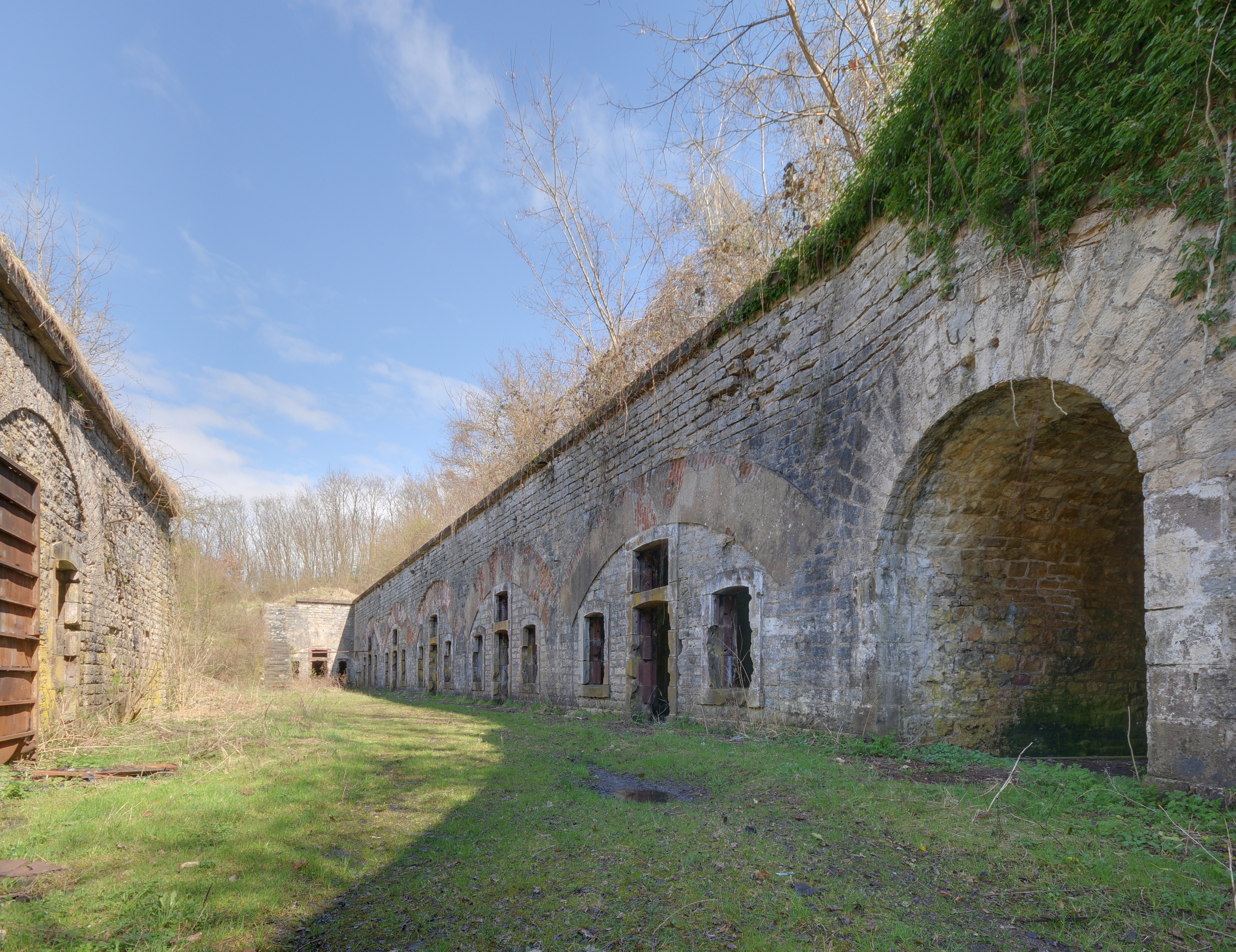
- Interior of the fort in 2011. (Photo: Thomas Bresson)

Site information
- Type: Fort, Séré de Rivières system
- Owner: French Army
- Controlled by: France
- Condition: Abandoned

Location
- Coordinates: 47.6303°N 6.8779°E

Site history
- Built: 1874
- Battles/wars: Siege of Belfort, Battle of France

Fort des Hautes Perches was built between 1874 and 1877 in Danjoutin and Belfort in northeastern France. It is part of the first ring of fortifications around the city of Belfort. The Forts des Perches were unique among the first group in their re-use of older sites. They were rebuilt as part of the Séré de Rivières system and incorporated improvements to deal with the improvement in efficacy of artillery in the late 19th century.

The fort was built at an elevation of 443 meters.

The Fort des Hautes Perches is small compared to others in the Belfort defensive array, although it is somewhat larger than the Fort des Basses Perches about one kilometer away to the southwest. It accommodated 216 soldiers, 8 non-commissioned officers, and 4 officers. Initial cost was 1,062,780 francs d'or. It was initially armed with 5 155mm long guns, 8 138mm guns, 2 121mm guns, and one 32mm mortar.

The fort is in poor condition. It remains the property of the French Army and is not accessible to the public.

== See also ==
- Fortified region of Belfort
