= Fort Ney =

Fort Ney may refer to:

- Fort Ney (de Roppe), Belfort, north eastern France
- Fort Ney (Fransecky), Strasbourg, France
