= Army Group 3 (France) =

French Army formation, 1939–1940

Groupe d'Armées 3 (GA 3)
- Active: Mobilized 1939 – Dissolved June 1940
- Country: France
- Branch: French Army
- Type: Army Group
- Role: Defense of the Maginot Line (Rhine Sector)
- Size: 3 Armies and 4 Army Corps in May 1940
- Part of: Directly subordinate to the Commander-in-Chief North-East Theatre (General Georges)
- Mottos: Rhin et Danube (English: Rhine and Danube)
- Engagements: Battle of France (1940)

Commanders
- Notable commanders: Général d'Armée Antoine-Marie-Benoit Besson (Sept 1939 – May 1940)

Army Group 3 (Groupe d'Armées 3 [GA 3]) was a French Army formation during the Battle of France in the Second World War, stationed along the river Rhine manning the Maginot Line.

It was responsible for manning the southern end of the Maginot Line, along the River Rhine and controlled one army. The army group's Commander-in-Chief was Général d'Armée Antoine-Marie-Benoit Besson.

== Fortified sectors ==
Until 16 March 1940, the Altkirch sector was part of the Fortified Region of Belfort. Afterwards, the Altkirch sector was under the command of the 44th Army Fortress Corps under General Tence, which was in turn under the command of the French 8th Army, General Garchery at the Fort de Giromagny, part of Army Group 3. The 44th Corps' headquarters was at Dannemarie. The 67th Infantry Division, commanded by General Boutignon, provided infantry support. The 67th DI was a series B reserve division, not suitable for heavy or sustained combat Following to its reorganization, the sector was called the Defensive Sector of Altkirch.

The SF/SD Altkirch was commanded by General Salvan. Fortress troops were provided by the 12th and 171st Fortress Infantry Regiments. Artillery support was provided by the third and fourth battalions of the 159th Position Artillery Regiment. At the midpoint of the Battle of France on 1 June 1940, the fortress troops of the SF Altkirch amounted to two fortress infantry regiments in five battalions, comprising 165 officers and 3,300 men.

== Order of battle ==
- French 8th Army - General Marcel Garchery
  - 7th Army Corps
    - 13th Infantry Division
    - 27th Infantry Division
    - 2nd Brigade de Spahis (7th and 9th Algerian Spahi regiments of cavalry (horsed))
  - 13th Army Corps
    - 19th Infantry Division
    - 54th Infantry Division
    - 104th Infantry Division
    - 105th Infantry Division
  - 44th Army Corps (France)
    - 67th Infantry Division
    - Fortified Sector of Altkirch
    - Fortified Sector of Montbéliard
    - Belfort Defences
- 45th Fortress Army Corps (HQ Ornans)
  - 57th Infantry Division (France)
  - 63rd Infantry Division
  - Jura Central Fortified Sector

== Bibliography ==
- Les Grandes Unités Françaises de la Guerre 1939–1945, Historiques Succincts, Service Historique de l'Armée de Terre (SHAT), Paris: Imprimerie nationale, 1967.
- Mary, Jean-Yves; Hohnadel, Alain; Sicard, Jacques. Hommes et Ouvrages de la Ligne Maginot, Tome 3, Histoire & Collections, 2003. ISBN 2-913903-88-6.
- Ragache, Gilles. La fin de la campagne de France : Les combats oubliés des armées du centre, 15 juin - 25 juin 1940. Paris, Economica, coll. « Campagnes et strategie », 2010. ISBN 978-2-7178-5830-3.
