= Fort de Vézelois =

Fort near Vézelois, France

Fort de Vézeloiss
- Part of Fortified region of Belfort
- Belfort, France
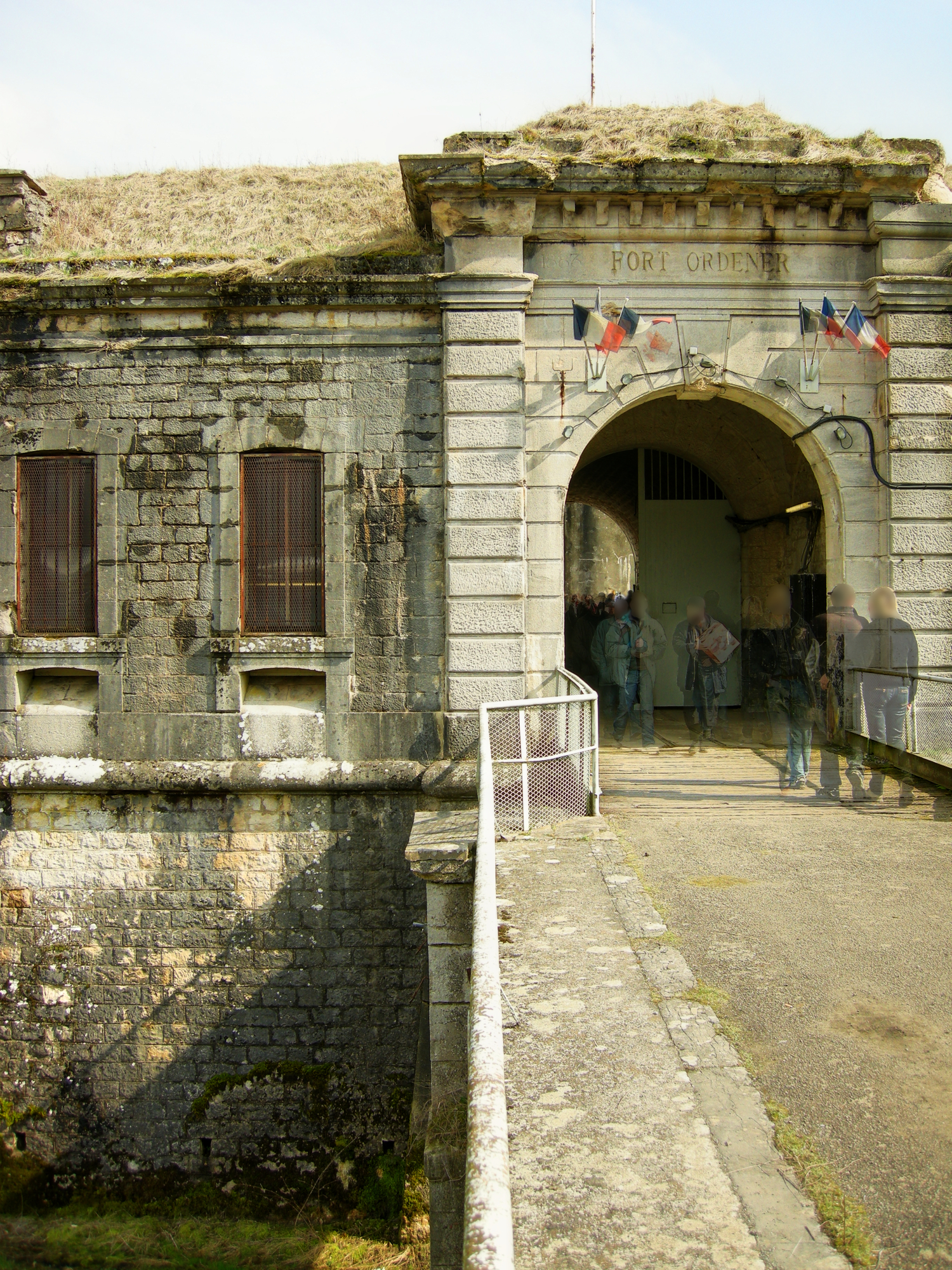
- Fort de Vézelois entrance, (Photo:Bresson Thomas)

Site information
- Type: Fort, Séré de Rivières system
- Owner: Commune de Vézelois
- Controlled by: France
- Open to the public: yes
- Condition: In restoration

Location
- Coordinates: 47.6005°N 6.9079°E

Site history
- Built: 1883
- Battles/wars: Siege of Belfort, Battle of France

Fort de Vézelois, also known as Fort Ordener, was built between 1883 and 1886 near Vézelois, to the southeast of Belfort in northeastern France. It is part of the first ring of fortifications around the city of Belfort. It is part of the second ring of fortifications around the city of Belfort in northeastern France. This set of forts was built as part of the Séré de Rivières system and incorporated improvements to deal with the improvement in efficacy of artillery in the late 19th century. The fort was formally named after French General Michel Ordener.

The Fort de Vézelois is similar to the Fort de Bessoncourt and was designed to support Bessoncourt and the Fort du Bois d'Oye, covering the road from Basel and the Mulhouse railway line. It was garrisoned by between 500 and 600 men. The fort received concrete cover in 1888–89, its artillery dispersed to batteries outside the fort. In 1909 the caponiers were replaced by counterscarps. Parapets and a subterranean shelter were provided for infantry, while a casemate, two machine gun turrets and a 75mm gun turret were added. From 1893 the fort was linked to other forts around Belfort via the Chemins de fer du Territoire de Belfort strategic railroad.

In 1940 the fort was manned by the 8th Battery of the 159th Position Artillery Regiment (RAP), part of the fortified region of Belfort under the French 8th Army, Army Group 3. From 16 March 1940 the RF Belfort became the 44th Fortress Corps (CAF).

After the Second World War the fort was used by the French Army for ammunition storage until the 1990s. The fort is now owned by the Commune of Vézelois and is in the care of an association for its restoration. The fort may be visited.

== See also ==
- Fortified region of Belfort
