= Fort des Basses Perches =

French Fort

- Part of Fortified region of Belfort
- Belfort, France
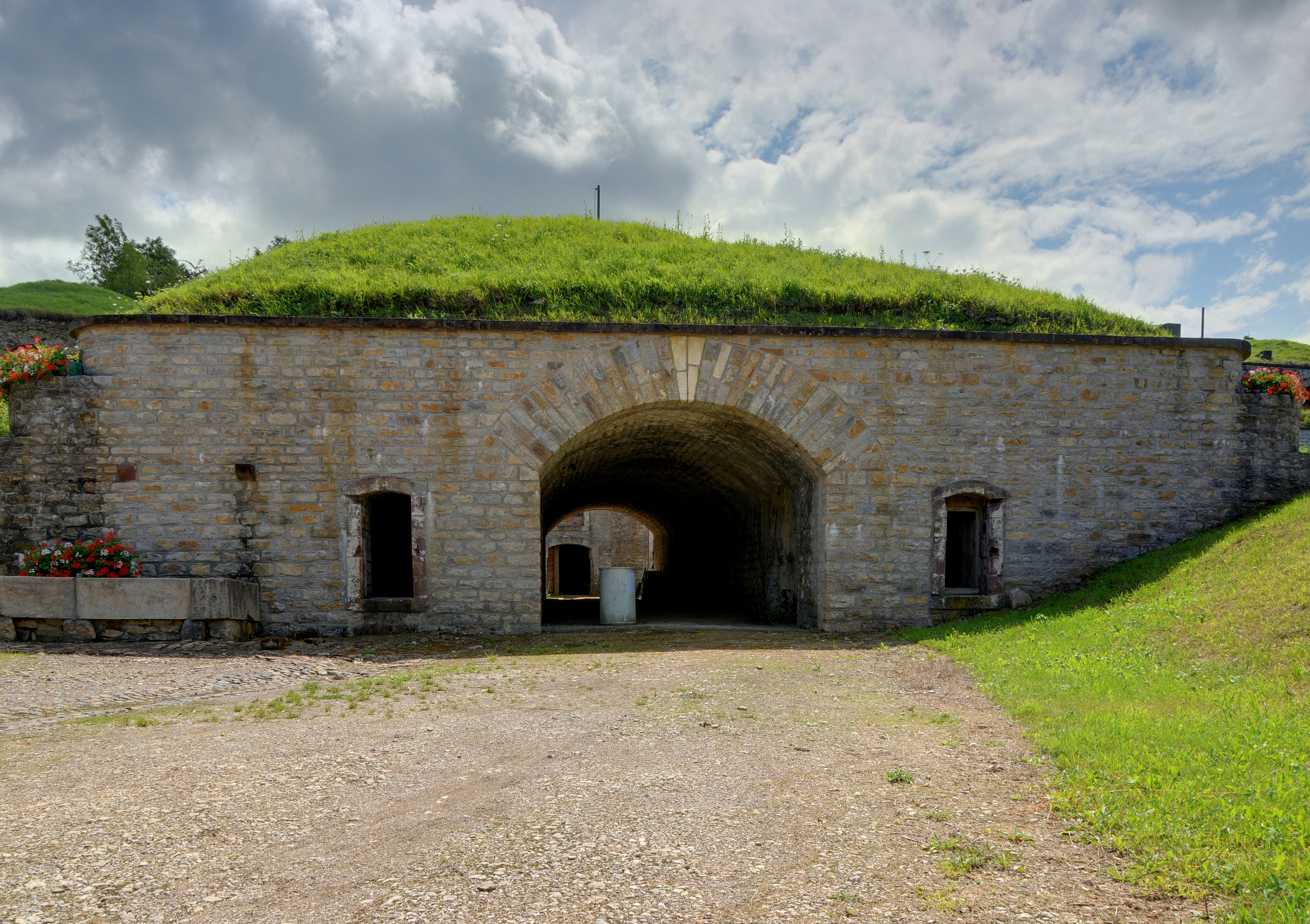
- Entrance to the fort.

Site information
- Type: Fort, Séré de Rivières system
- Owner: Commune of Danjoutin since 1999
- Controlled by: France
- Open to the public: by appointment
- Condition: In restoration

Location
- Coordinates: 47.6261°N 6.8687°E

Site history
- Built: 1874
- Battles/wars: Siege of Belfort, Battle of France

Fort des Basses Perches, also known as Fort Valmy, was built between 1874 and 1877 in Danjoutin and Belfort in northeastern France. It is part of the first ring of fortifications around the city of Belfort. The Forts des Perches were unique among the first group in their re-use of older sites. They were rebuilt as part of the Séré de Rivières system and incorporated improvements to deal with the improvement in efficacy of artillery in the late 19th century. The fort's official name was derived from François-Christophe Kellermann, Duke of Valmy and Marshal of France.

The first fortification at the Perches hill was an excavated rampart dating to 1815. A dry-masonry fort was built at the Basses Perches location in 1870 by Colonel Pierre Denfert-Rochereau during his defense of Belfort, at an elevation of 425 m. The present Fort des Basses Perches was built on this site, as it had proven to be a strategically important part of the southern defenses of Belfort during the Franco-Prussian War. The roughly rectangular fort is notable for its early use of counterscarps in place of caponiers, which had been more popular until then.

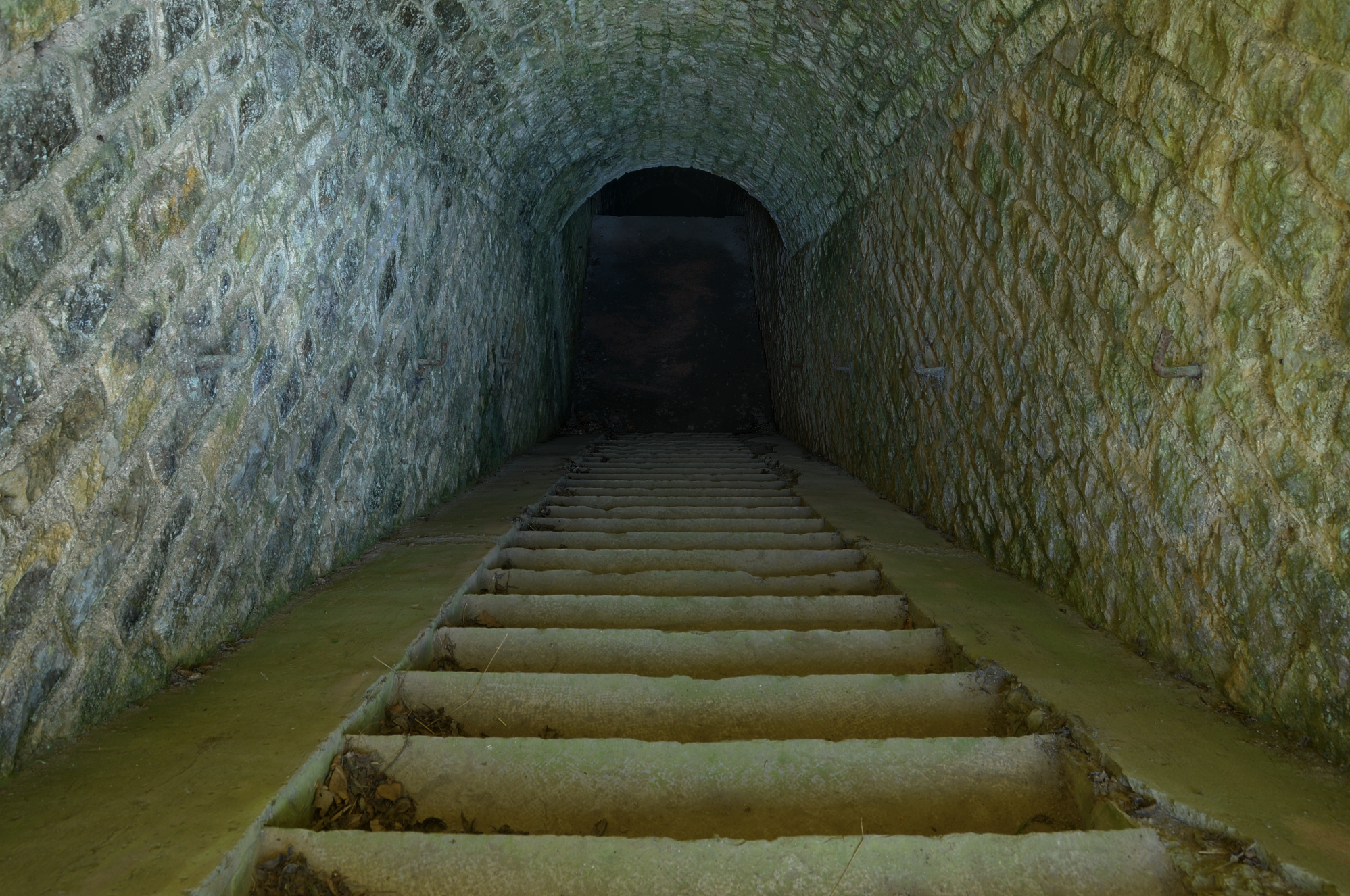
Access to the southwest counterscarp.

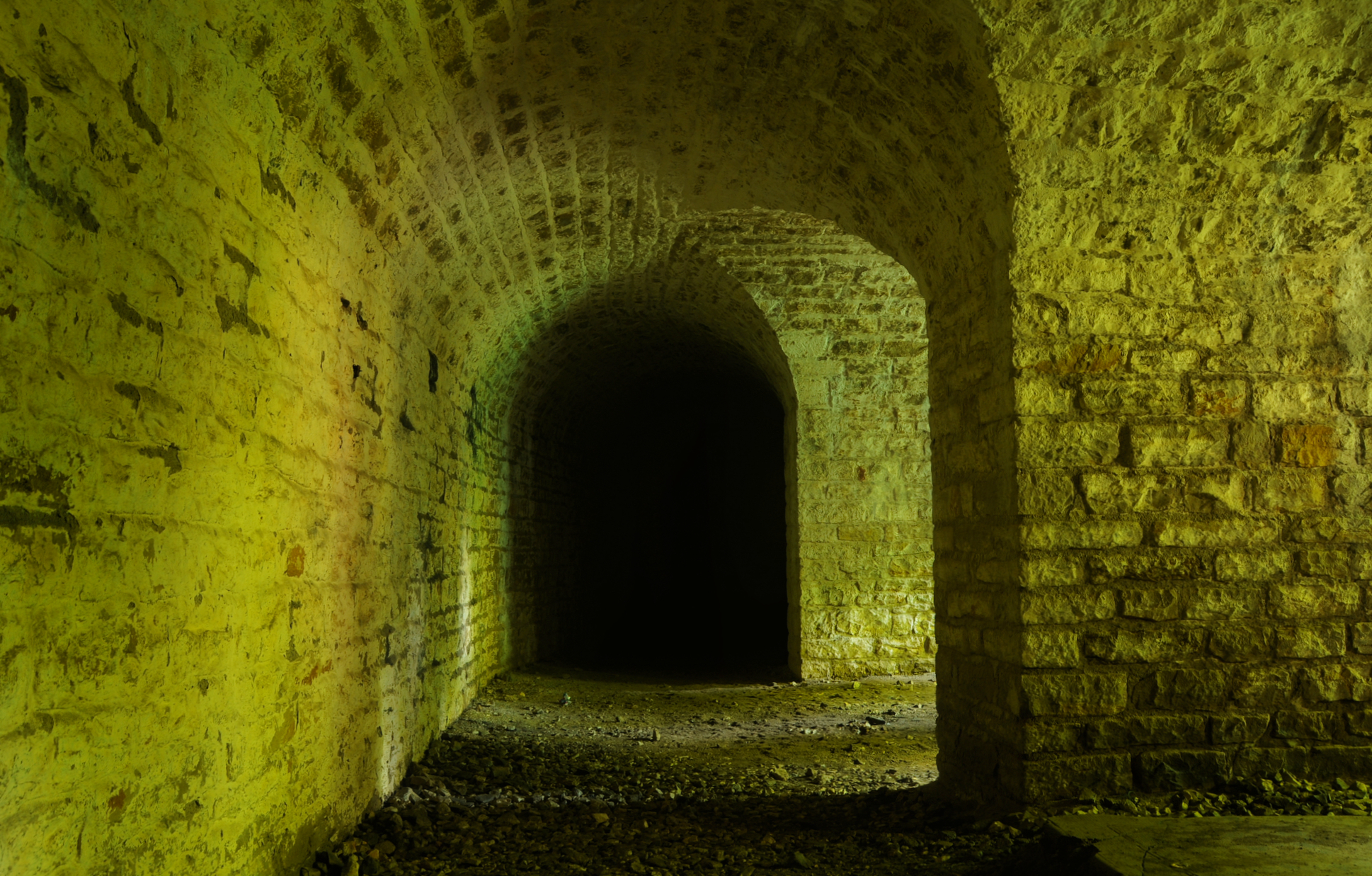
Southwest counterscarp.

The Fort des Basses Perches is small compared to others in the Belfort defensive array. It accommodated 126 soldiers, 4 non-commissioned officers, and 2 officers. Initial cost was 939,000 francs d'or. It was initially armed with 4 155mm long guns, 9 138mm guns, 4 121mm guns, 1 22mm howitzer and 2 22mm mortars.

From 1893 the fort was linked to other forts around Belfort via the Chemins de fer du Territoire de Belfort strategic railroad. The Fort des Hautes Perches is about one km to the northeast. Apart from a concrete observation post built between 1914 and 1918, the fort was never modernised. It is now owned by the commune of Danjoutin and is open to the public by appointment.

== See also ==
- Fortified region of Belfort
