= Fort du Bois d'Oye =

- Part of Fortified region of Belfort
- Belfort, France
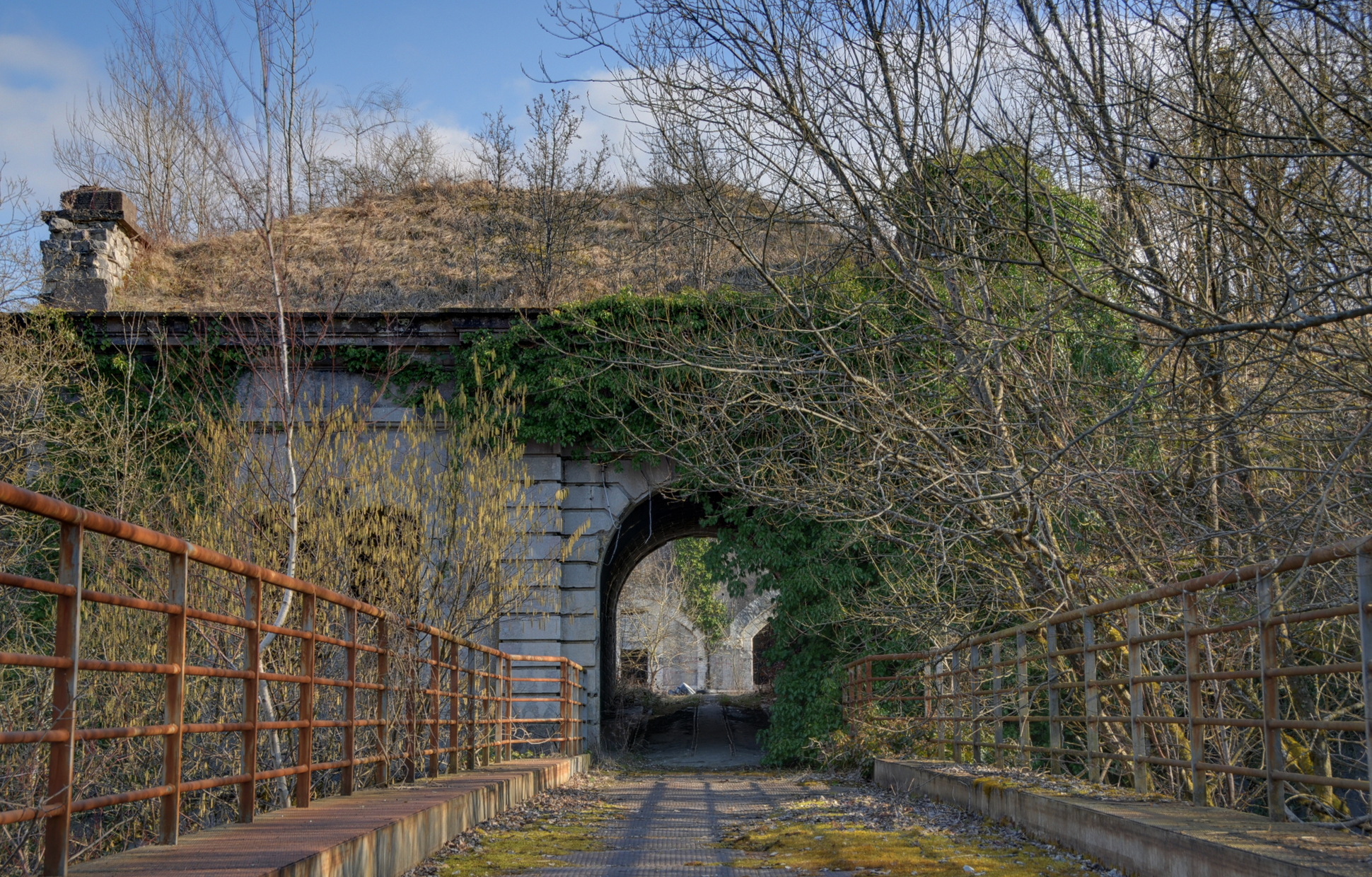
- Entrance to the fort. Photo:Bresson Thomas

Site information
- Type: Fort, Séré de Rivières system
- Owner: French army
- Controlled by: France
- Open to the public: no
- Condition: Abandoned

Location
- Coordinates: 47.5747°N 6.8430°E

Site history
- Built: 1883
- Battles/wars: Battle of France

Fort Bois d'Oye, also known as Fort Eblé, is located in the commune of Bermont. It was built between 1883 and 1886. It is part of the second ring of fortifications around the city of Belfort in northeastern France. This second ring of forts was built as part of the Séré de Rivières system and incorporated improvements to deal with the improvement in efficacy of artillery in the late 19th century.

== Description ==
The large pentagonal fort was built of limestone, with walls surrounding a large open court. At an elevation of 420 meters, the fort was designed to overlook the railways Montbéliard and Delle, and to cover its neighbors, Fort Lachaux and Fort de Vézelois. Water was provided by a well and cistern. The garrison included 624 soldiers, 32 non-commissioned officers and 17 officers. Initial armament included 17 155mm long guns, 5 120mm long guns, 2 220mm mortars and several smaller weapons.

In 1890 a large personnel shelter (abri-caverne) was built north of the fort. In case of attack on Belfort, it was designated as an assembly place for reserves and as a shelter from bombardment.

After 1893 the fort was linked to other forts around Belfort via the Chemins de fer du Territoire de Belfort strategic railroad. The fort was modernized between 1908 and 1913, when it was clad with concrete cover. Defensive arrangements were modified, and a casemate, three machine gun turrets, and one turret each for 75 mm and 155 mm guns were added.

== World War II and present status ==
The area saw some fighting during the liberation of Belfort in 1944. The fort remains the property of the French Army and is not accessible to the public.

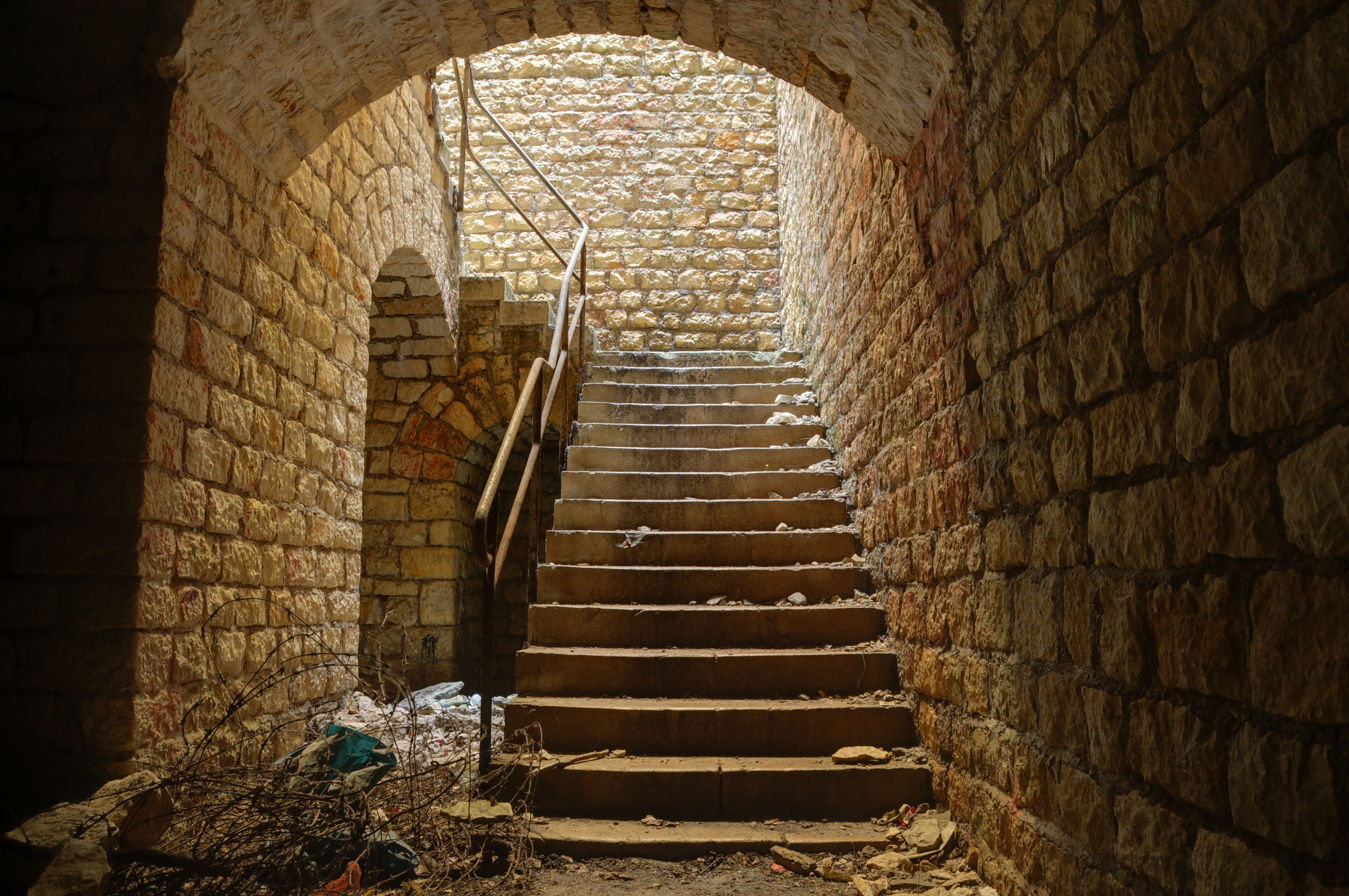
Stair near main entry Photo: Bresson Thomas

== See also ==
- Fortified region of Belfort
