= Antoine-Marie-Benoît Besson =

French military officer

Benoît Besson
- Benoît Antoine Marie Besson
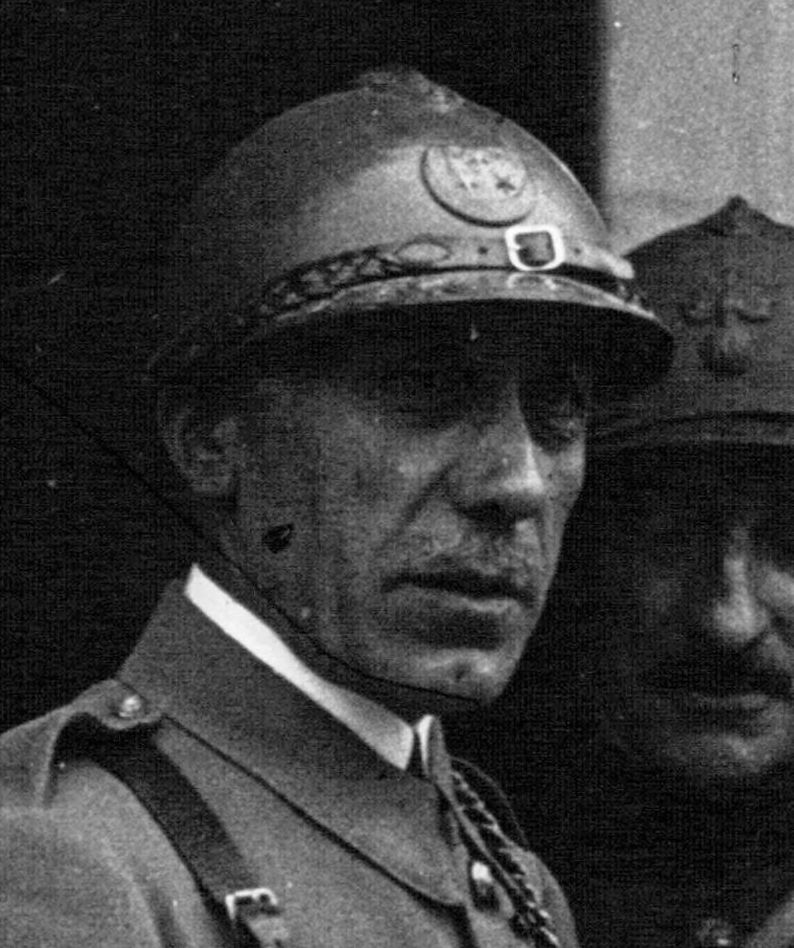
- General Besson in 1932
- Born: September 14, 1876; Pomeys. France
- Died: July 23, 1969 (aged 92); Paris, France
- Military career
- Allegiance: France
- Branch: French Army
- Service years: 1896–1940
- Rank: Army general
- Commands: 3rd Army Group (France); 6th Army; 16th Army Corps; 15th Infantry Division; 58th Brigade; 4th Zouaves Regiment
- Conflicts: World War I World War II
- Awards: Grand Cross of the Legion of Honor

Antoine-Marie-Benoit Besson (September 14, 1876 – July 23, 1969) was a French military officer. In World War II he was a general commanding the Third Army Group stationed along the river Rhine manning the Maginot Line.

== Military career ==
=== World War I: 1914–1918 ===
During World War I, Besson commanded the 4th Zouaves Regiment.

=== Interwar period: 1918–1939 ===
In the interbellum, he commanded the 58th Brigade, the 15th Infantry Division and the 16th Army Corps.

=== World War II: 1939–1940 ===
In September 1939, he commanded the 6th Army deployed in the Alps.

In October 1939, he took command of the French 3rd Army Group, which covered the section of the Maginot Line along the Rhine and the Swiss frontier. He and his command surrendered after 25 June as German Panzer units had reached the Swiss border and cut off the Maginot Line from the rest of France.

== Sources ==
M Romanych & M Rupp, Maginot Line 1940, Battles on the French frontier, Osprey Publishing, page 13
