= Fort de Roppe =

- Part of Fortified region of Belfort
- Belfort, France
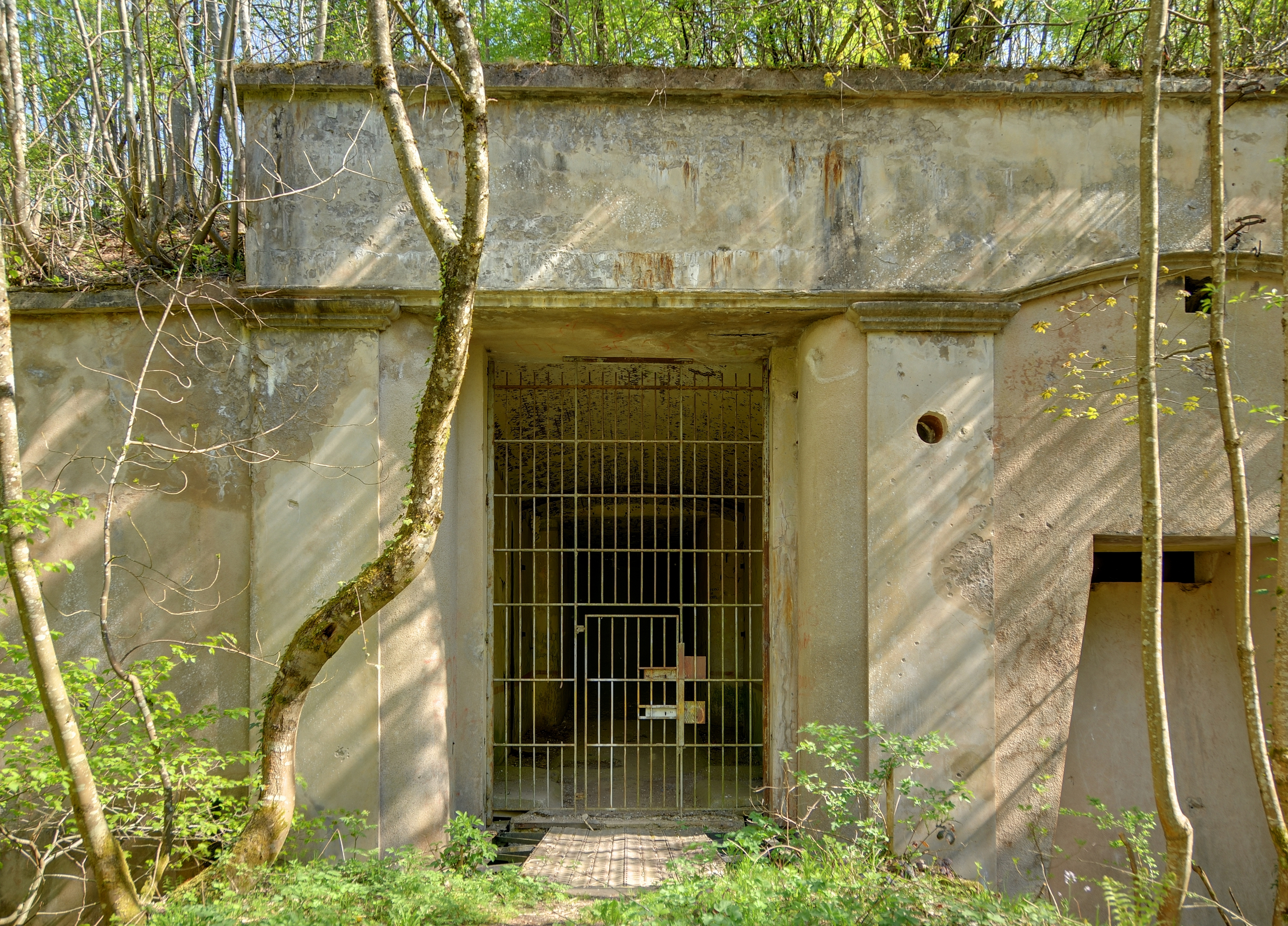
- Interior court

Site information
- Type: Fort, Séré de Rivières system
- Owner: French army
- Controlled by: France
- Open to the public: no
- Condition: Abandoned

Location
- Coordinates: 47.6802°N 6.8996°E

Site history
- Built: 1875
- Battles/wars: Battle of France

Fort de Roppe, also known as Fort Ney, was built between 1875 and 1877. It is part of the second ring of fortifications around the city of Belfort in northeastern France. This set of forts was built as part of the Séré de Rivières system and incorporated improvements to deal with the improvement in efficacy of artillery in the late 19th century.

== Description ==
The Fort de Roppe is located at the summit of a hill near the town of Roppe, to the north of Belfort. It was sited to control the road to Colmar in co-operation with the fort at Giromagny, as well as the road to Basel, to protect the Fort de Bessoncourt's flank, and to support Fort du Salbert. The rectangular fort initially mounted fifty artillery pieces and was garrisoned by more than 650 men. The guns were mounted in the open air on top of the ramparts and in a casemate. Three more batteries were located in the immediate vicinity of the fort. The armament of the fort varied considerably from year to year. In 1886 the fort mounted four 155mm long guns, five 138mm guns, nine 120mm long guns, two 220mm mortars, and several smaller weapons.

The fort's water needs were met by a well and a cistern. The magazine could hold 154 tons of powder. Initial construction cost was 1,875,917 francs d'or.

=== Improvements ===
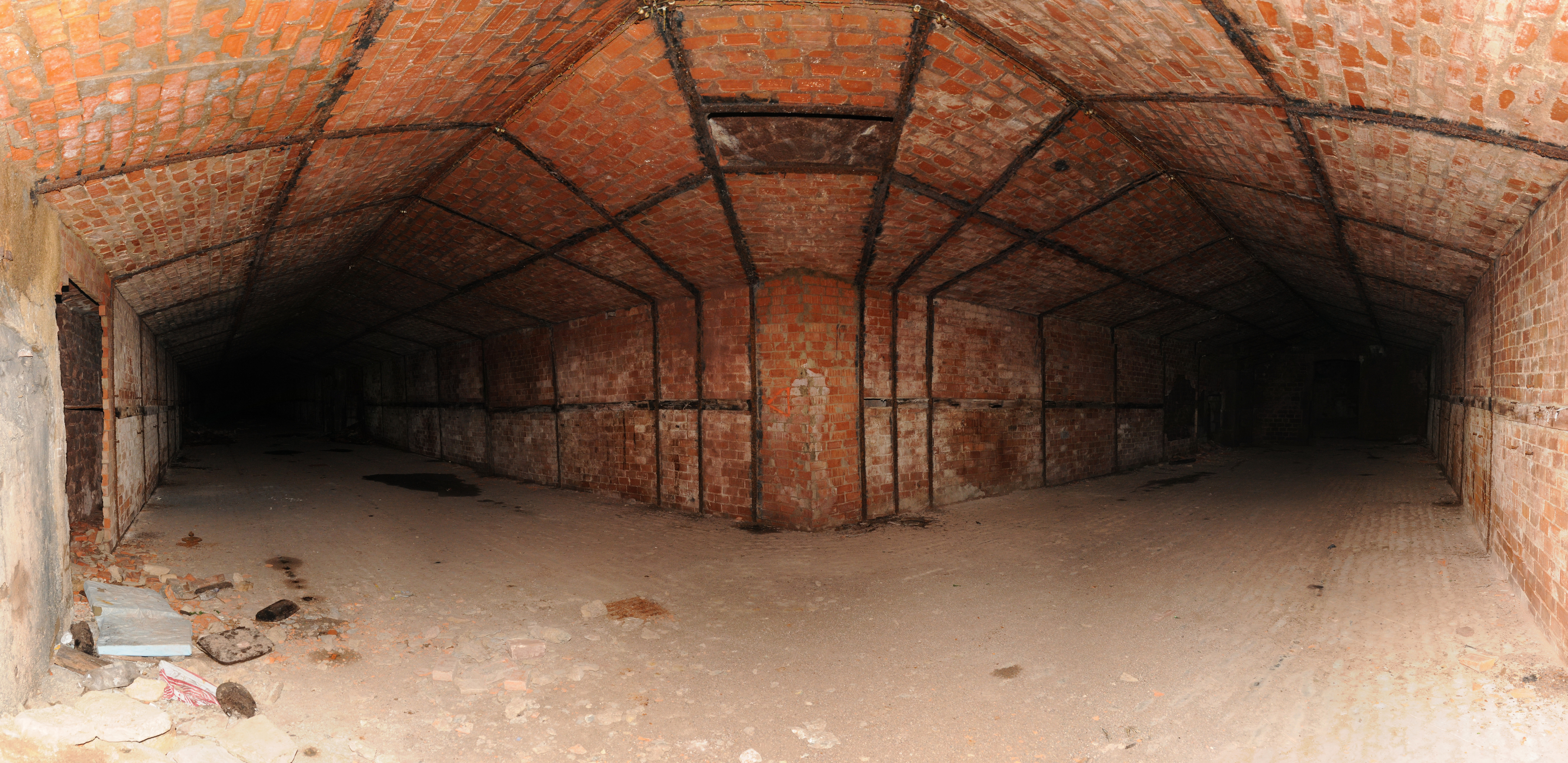
Underground troop shelter.

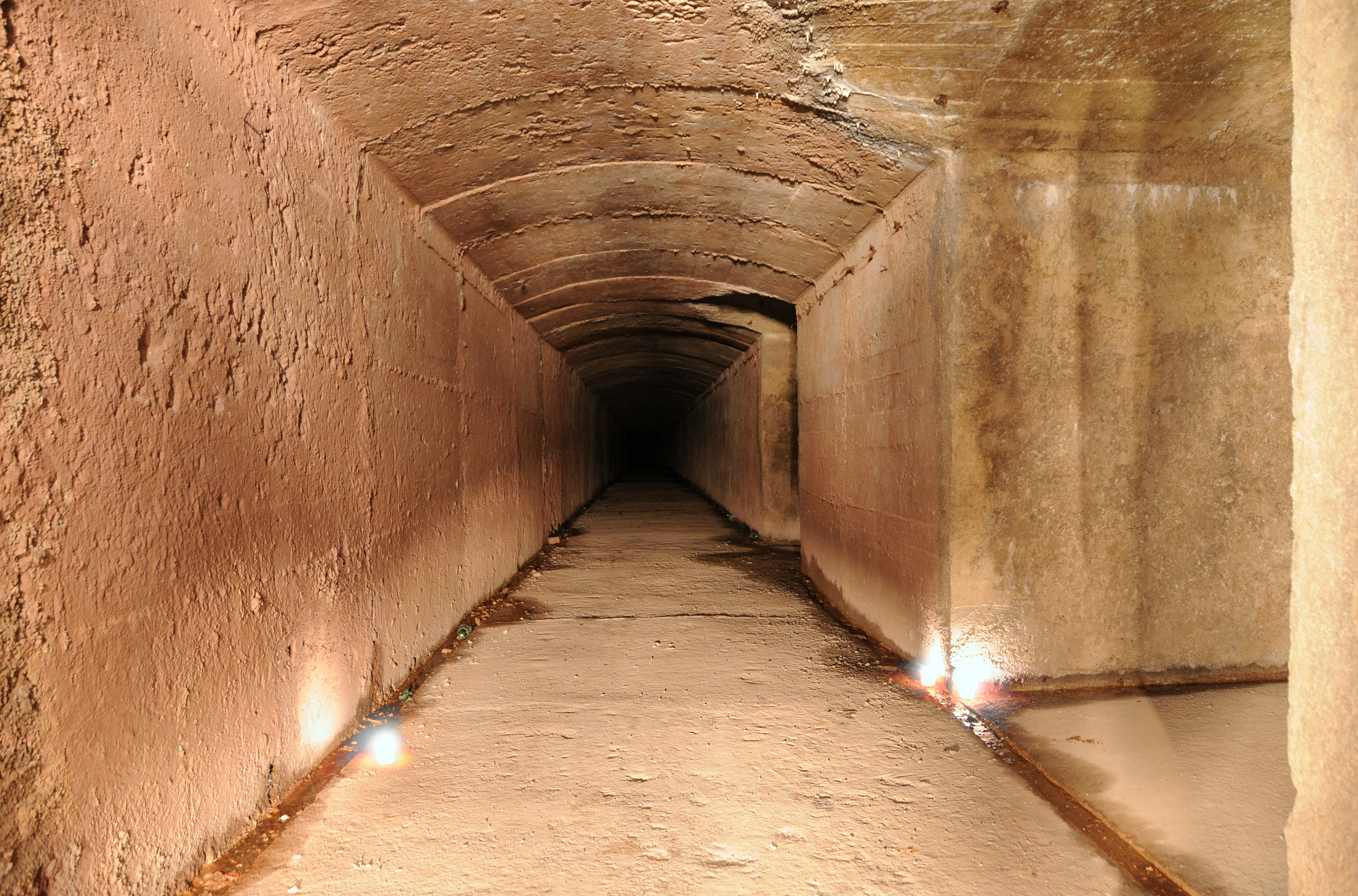
Underground galleries.

In 1889 an underground troop shelter was constructed just outside the perimeter to the southwest. From 1893 the fort was linked to other forts around Belfort via the Chemins de fer du Territoire de Belfort strategic railroad. Underground galleries shielded with concrete were built beneath the fort during the First World War. These galleries connected various portions of the fort to the troop shelter, which was itself concreted. Additional improvements included a 155 mm gun turret, three machine gun turrets, an additional casemate and shelters on the ramparts. The neighborhood of the fort received more batteries, a 75 mm turret, infantry shelters and a battery with two 155 mm gun turrets, the last never completed. The new gun turrets, located to the east of the main fort, were connected to the main fort by extensions to the underground galleries.

== World War II and present status ==
In 1940 the fort was manned by the 7th Battery of the 159th Position Artillery Regiment (RAP), part of the fortified region of Belfort under the French 8th Army, Army Group 3. From 16 March 1940 the RF Belfort became the 44th Fortress Corps (CAF). In June during the Battle of France, 400 men sought shelter at Fort de Roppe, staying for three days before surrendering. The fort remains the property of the French Army. Although abandoned, it still remains in good condition. Public access is prohibited.

== See also ==
- Fortified region of Belfort
