= Roppe =

- Commune
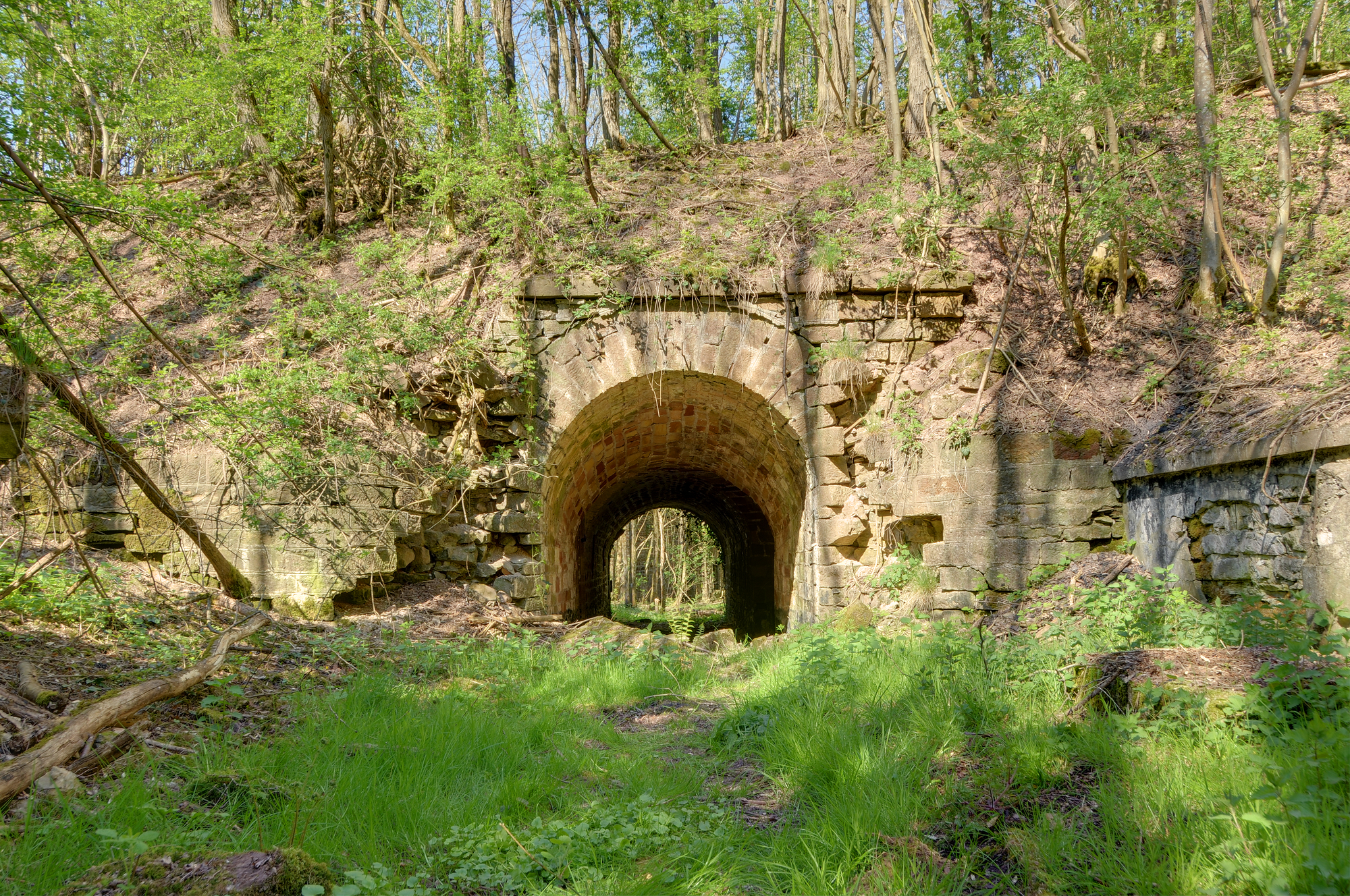
- Fort de Roppe

- Coat of arms
- Location of Roppe
- Location within France Location within Bourgogne-Franche-Comté
- Coordinates: 47°40′14″N 6°55′10″E
- Country: France
- Region: Bourgogne-Franche-Comté
- Department: Territoire de Belfort
- Arrondissement: Belfort
- Canton: Valdoie
- Intercommunality: Grand Belfort

Government
  - Mayor (2020–2026): Jean-François Rousseau
- Area^{1}: 7.43 km^{2} (2.87 sq mi)
- Highest elevation: 511 m (1,677 ft)
- Lowest elevation: 353 m (1,158 ft)
- Population (2023): 1,041
  - Density: 140/km^{2} (363/sq mi)
- Time zone: UTC+01:00 (CET)
  - Summer (DST): UTC+02:00 (CEST)
- INSEE/Postal code: 90087 /90380
- ^{1} French Land Register data, which excludes lakes, ponds, glaciers > 1 km^{2} (0.386 sq mi or 247 acres) and river estuaries.

Roppe (French pronunciation: [ʁɔp]) is a commune in the Territoire de Belfort department in Bourgogne-Franche-Comté in northeastern France.

== See also ==
- Fort de Roppe
- Communes of the Territoire de Belfort department
