= Bermont, Territoire de Belfort =

Bermont
- Commune
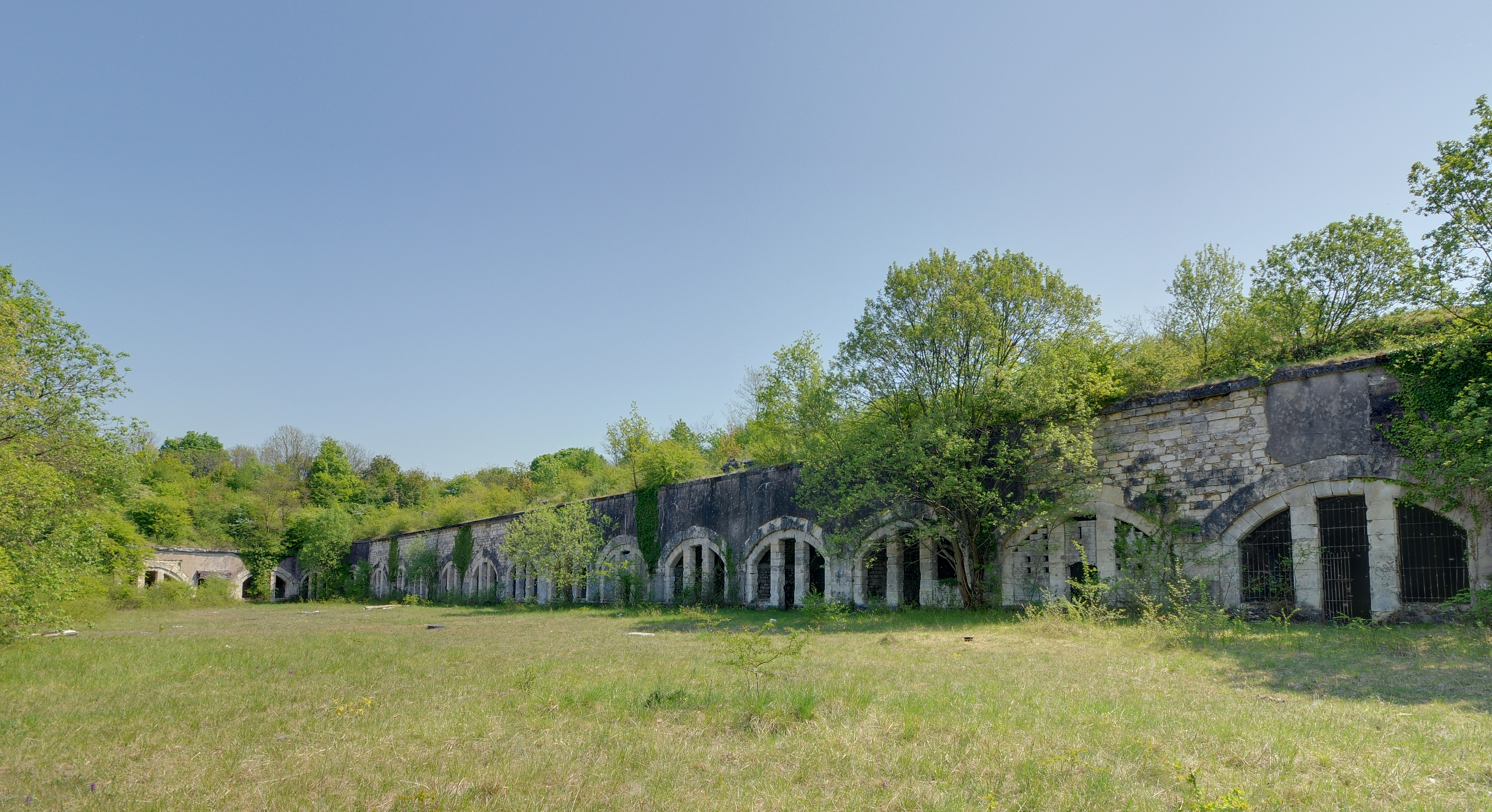
- A view in the courtyard of Fort du Bois d'Oye

- Coat of arms
- Location of Bermont
- Location within France Location within Bourgogne-Franche-Comté
- Coordinates: 47°34′51″N 6°51′15″E
- Country: France
- Region: Bourgogne-Franche-Comté
- Department: Territoire de Belfort
- Arrondissement: Belfort
- Canton: Châtenois-les-Forges
- Intercommunality: Grand Belfort

Government
  - Mayor (2020–2026): Pascal Grosjean
- Area^{1}: 2.74 km^{2} (1.06 sq mi)
- Highest elevation: 430 m (1,410 ft)
- Lowest elevation: 331 m (1,086 ft)
- Population (2023): 358
  - Density: 131/km^{2} (338/sq mi)
- Time zone: UTC+01:00 (CET)
  - Summer (DST): UTC+02:00 (CEST)
- INSEE/Postal code: 90011 /90400
- ^{1} French Land Register data, which excludes lakes, ponds, glaciers > 1 km^{2} (0.386 sq mi or 247 acres) and river estuaries.

Bermont (French pronunciation: [bɛʁmɔ̃]) is a commune in the Territoire de Belfort department in Bourgogne-Franche-Comté in northeastern France.

== See also ==
- Fort du Bois d'Oye
- Communes of the Territoire de Belfort department
