= Fortified Sector of the Jura =

French military organization

The Fortified Sector of the Jura (French: Secteur Fortifiée du Jura) was the French military organization that, in 1940, controlled the French frontier with Switzerland, in the general area of Besançon. The area was lightly fortified, since the Swiss border was regarded as a low-risk frontier, save for the possibility of an advance from Germany through Switzerland into France. The Jura Mountains and the Doubs River presented natural barriers to invasion, allowing defenses to concentrate on a few points of potential access. The SF Jura was bordered on the east by the Fortified Sector of Montbéliard.

== Concept and organization ==
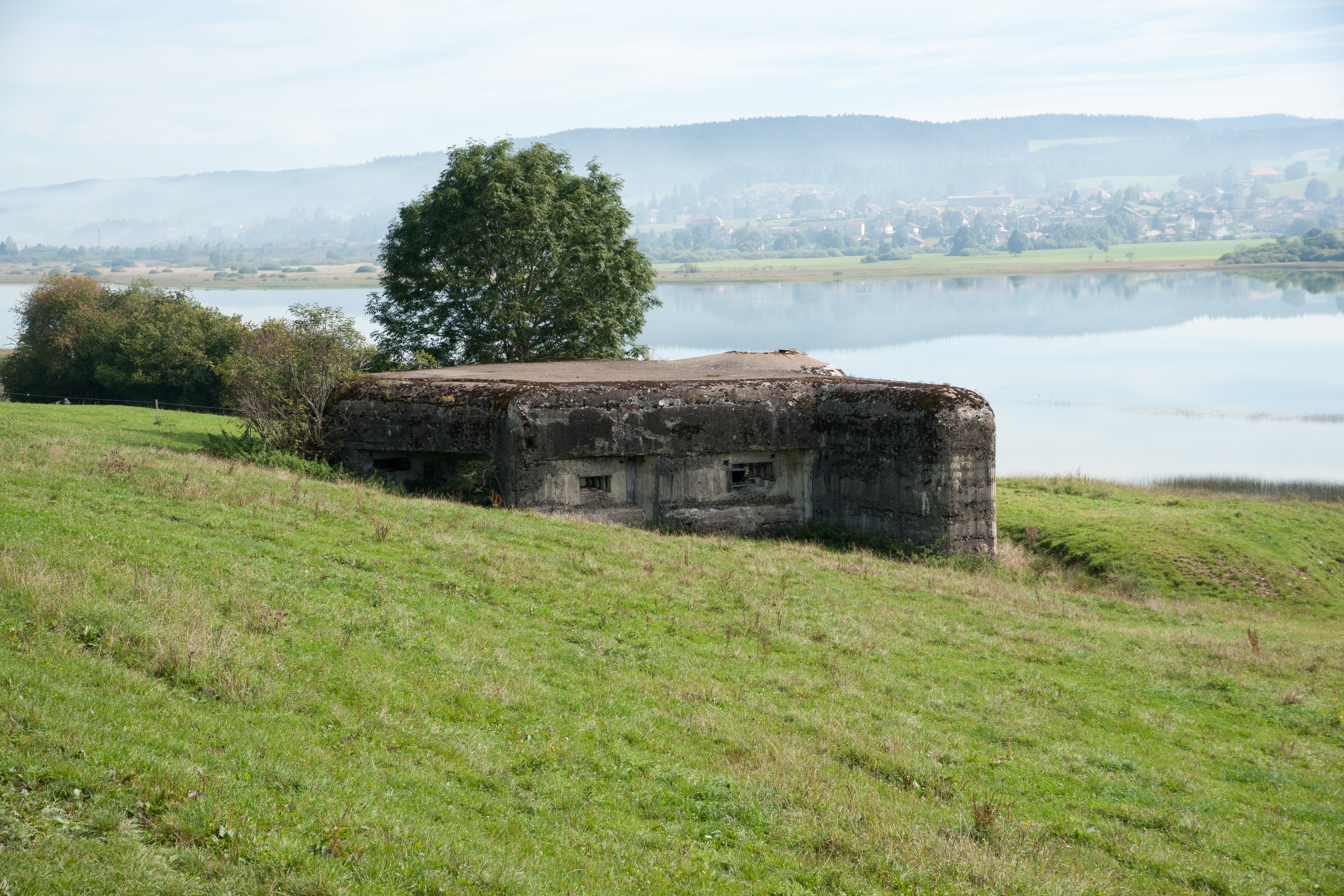
Bunker on the Lac de Remoray

The sector's chief fortifications were old Séré de Rivières positions like the Fort de Joux, Fort de Larmont and the Fort Saint-Antione. A late effort in 1939-1940 constructed the CEZF Line, consisting of two sections of casemates. The northern section, around Morteau, consisted of four casemates, out of the fourteen proposed. The southern section, around Pontarlier, consisted of three casemates, out of the six proposed. Road barriers were built at Goumois, La Goule, Biaufond and La Rasse. Crossings of the Doubs were fortified at Villiers-le-Lac, Morteau, Pont-de-la-Roche and La Cluse.

== Command ==
The Jura sector was under the command General Huet, commanding a demi-brigade of chasseurs pyrénéens. From 15 January 1940 the Jura Army Corps (corps d'armée du Jura) took responsibility for field operations in the Jura. Within ten days, it was renamed the 45th Army Fortress Corps (45e corps d'armée de foretresse). The corps comprised the 57th Infantry Division under General Texier, and the 63rd Infantry Division under General Parvy. Both were class B reserve divisions, not suitable for heavy or sustained combat. The SF Jura was attached to the 45th CAF on 16 March 1940. Until 19 May, the 45th CAF was an autonomous unit. Afterwards it was attached to the 8th Army. At the midpoint of the Battle of France on 1 June 1940, the fortress troops of the SF Jura amounted to a chasseurs pyrénéens regiment in three battalions, comprising 85 officers and 2,750 men.

== Battle of France ==
The German offensive (Operation Kleiner Bär) across the Rhine was concentrated in the area near and to the north of Colmar, with little fighting in the Altkirch sector. The offensive, launched on 15 June, was rendered unimportant when the German XIX Corps under General Heinz Guderian reached the Swiss border on 17 June, behind the main French line. Guderian approached the SF Jura from the rear, crossing the Doubs at Saint-Vit near Besançon. German advance parties reached the Swiss border near Pontarlier.

== Bibliography ==
- Allcorn, William. The Maginot Line 1928-45. Oxford: Osprey Publishing, 2003. ISBN 1-84176-646-1
- Kaufmann, J.E. and Kaufmann, H.W. Fortress France: The Maginot Line and French Defenses in World War II, Stackpole Books, 2006. ISBN 0-275-98345-5
- Kaufmann, J.E., Kaufmann, H.W., Jancovič-Potočnik, A. and Lang, P. The Maginot Line: History and Guide, Pen and Sword, 2011. ISBN 978-1-84884-068-3
- Mary, Jean-Yves; Hohnadel, Alain; Sicard, Jacques. Hommes et Ouvrages de la Ligne Maginot, Tome 1. Paris, Histoire & Collections, 2001. ISBN 2-908182-88-2 (in French)
- Mary, Jean-Yves; Hohnadel, Alain; Sicard, Jacques. Hommes et Ouvrages de la Ligne Maginot, Tome 3. Paris, Histoire & Collections, 2003. ISBN 2-913903-88-6 (in French)
- Mary, Jean-Yves; Hohnadel, Alain; Sicard, Jacques. Hommes et Ouvrages de la Ligne Maginot, Tome 5. Paris, Histoire & Collections, 2009. ISBN 978-2-35250-127-5 (in French)
- Romanych, Marc; Rupp, Martin. Maginot Line 1940: Battles on the French Frontier. Oxford: Osprey Publishing, 2010. ISBN 1-84176-646-1
