= Vézelois =

- Commune
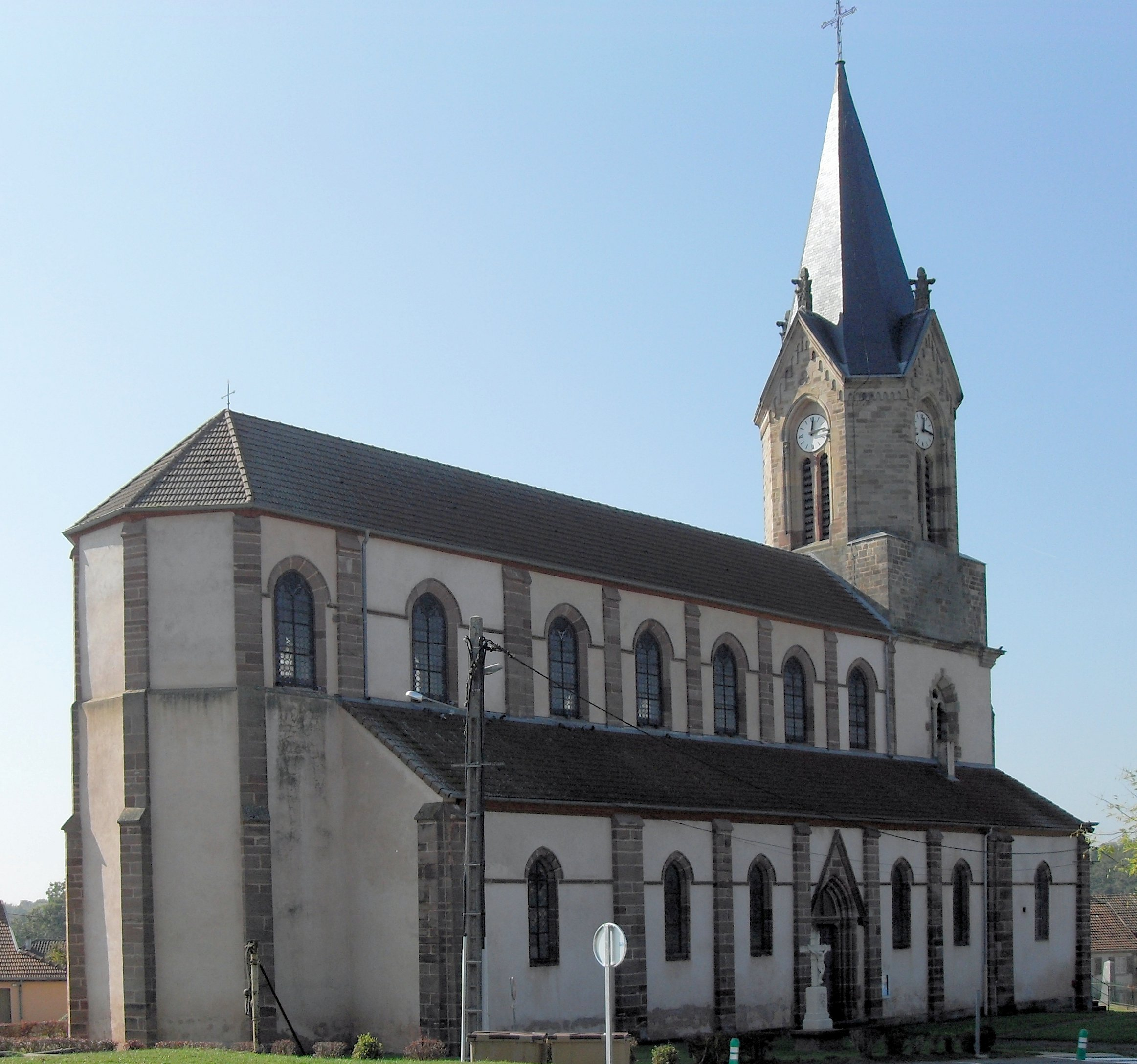
- The church of Saint-Thiébaud

- Coat of arms
- Location of Vézelois
- Location within France Location within Bourgogne-Franche-Comté
- Coordinates: 47°36′28″N 6°54′59″E
- Country: France
- Region: Bourgogne-Franche-Comté
- Department: Territoire de Belfort
- Arrondissement: Belfort
- Canton: Châtenois-les-Forges
- Intercommunality: Grand Belfort

Government
  - Mayor (2020–2026): Roland Jacquemin
- Area^{1}: 9.43 km^{2} (3.64 sq mi)
- Highest elevation: 412 m (1,352 ft)
- Lowest elevation: 350 m (1,150 ft)
- Population (2023): 1,029
  - Density: 109/km^{2} (283/sq mi)
- Time zone: UTC+01:00 (CET)
  - Summer (DST): UTC+02:00 (CEST)
- INSEE/Postal code: 90104 /90400
- ^{1} French Land Register data, which excludes lakes, ponds, glaciers > 1 km^{2} (0.386 sq mi or 247 acres) and river estuaries.

Vézelois (French pronunciation: [vezlwa]) is a commune in the Territoire de Belfort department in Bourgogne-Franche-Comté in northeastern France.

== See also ==
- Communes of the Territoire de Belfort department
