= Danjoutin =

- Commune
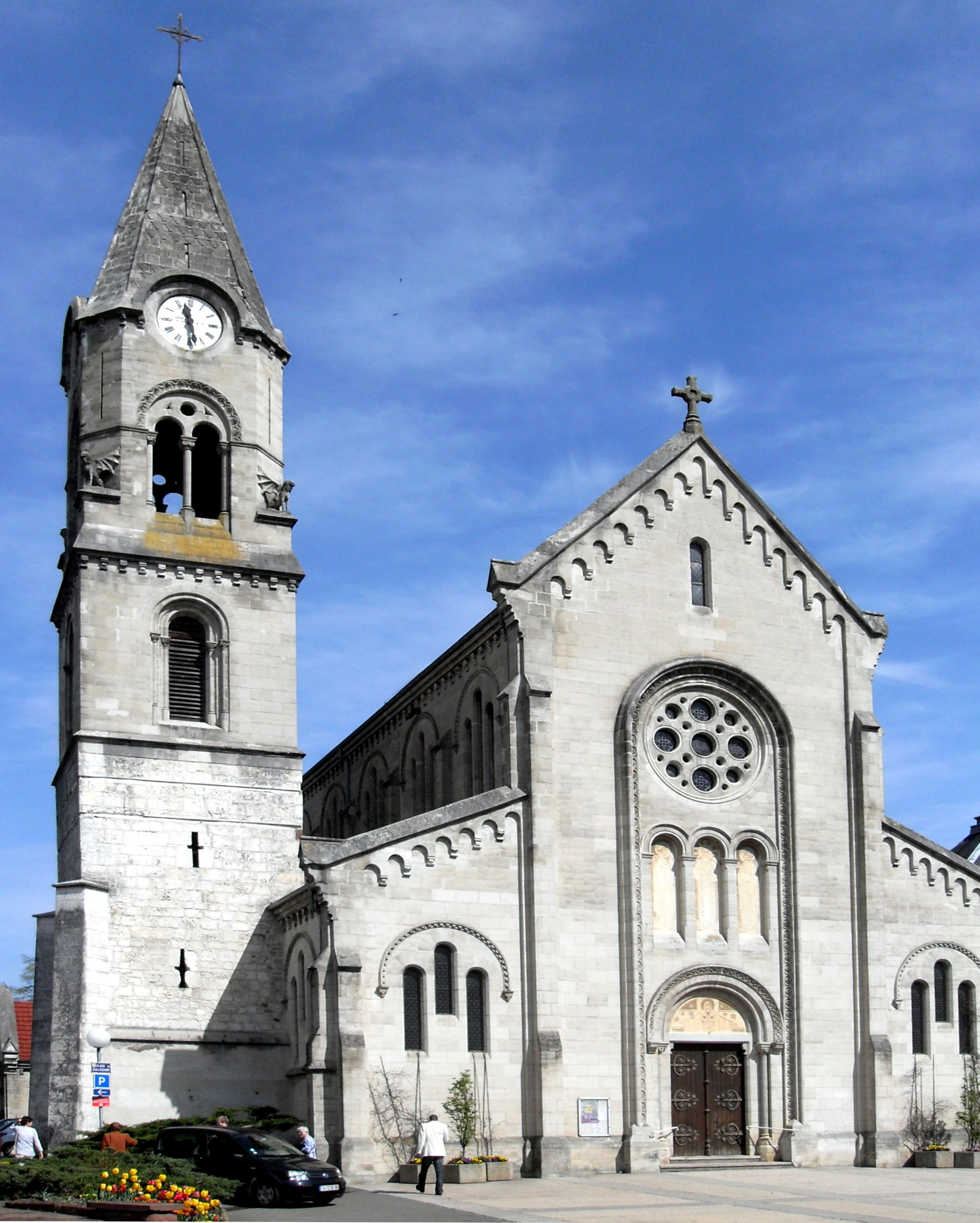
- Saint-Just Church
- Location of Danjoutin
- Location within France Location within Bourgogne-Franche-Comté
- Coordinates: 47°37′07″N 6°51′53″E
- Country: France
- Region: Bourgogne-Franche-Comté
- Department: Territoire de Belfort
- Arrondissement: Belfort
- Canton: Bavilliers
- Intercommunality: Grand Belfort

Government
  - Mayor (2020–2026): Emmanuel Formet
- Area^{1}: 5.65 km^{2} (2.18 sq mi)
- Highest elevation: 427 m (1,401 ft)
- Lowest elevation: 342 m (1,122 ft)
- Population (2023): 3,519
  - Density: 623/km^{2} (1,610/sq mi)
- Time zone: UTC+01:00 (CET)
  - Summer (DST): UTC+02:00 (CEST)
- INSEE/Postal code: 90032 /90400
- ^{1} French Land Register data, which excludes lakes, ponds, glaciers > 1 km^{2} (0.386 sq mi or 247 acres) and river estuaries.

Danjoutin (French pronunciation: [dɑ̃ʒutɛ̃]) is a commune in the Territoire de Belfort department in Bourgogne-Franche-Comté in northeastern France.

== Population ==
Historical population
Year	Pop.	±% p.a.
1968	3,520	—
1975	3,695	+0.70%
1982	3,451	−0.97%
1990	3,103	−1.32%
1999	3,383	+0.96%
2007	3,572	+0.68%
2012	3,612	+0.22%
2017	3,715	+0.56%
2023	3,519	−0.90%
Source: INSEE

== See also ==
- Fort des Basses Perches
- Communes of the Territoire de Belfort department
