= Ourse =

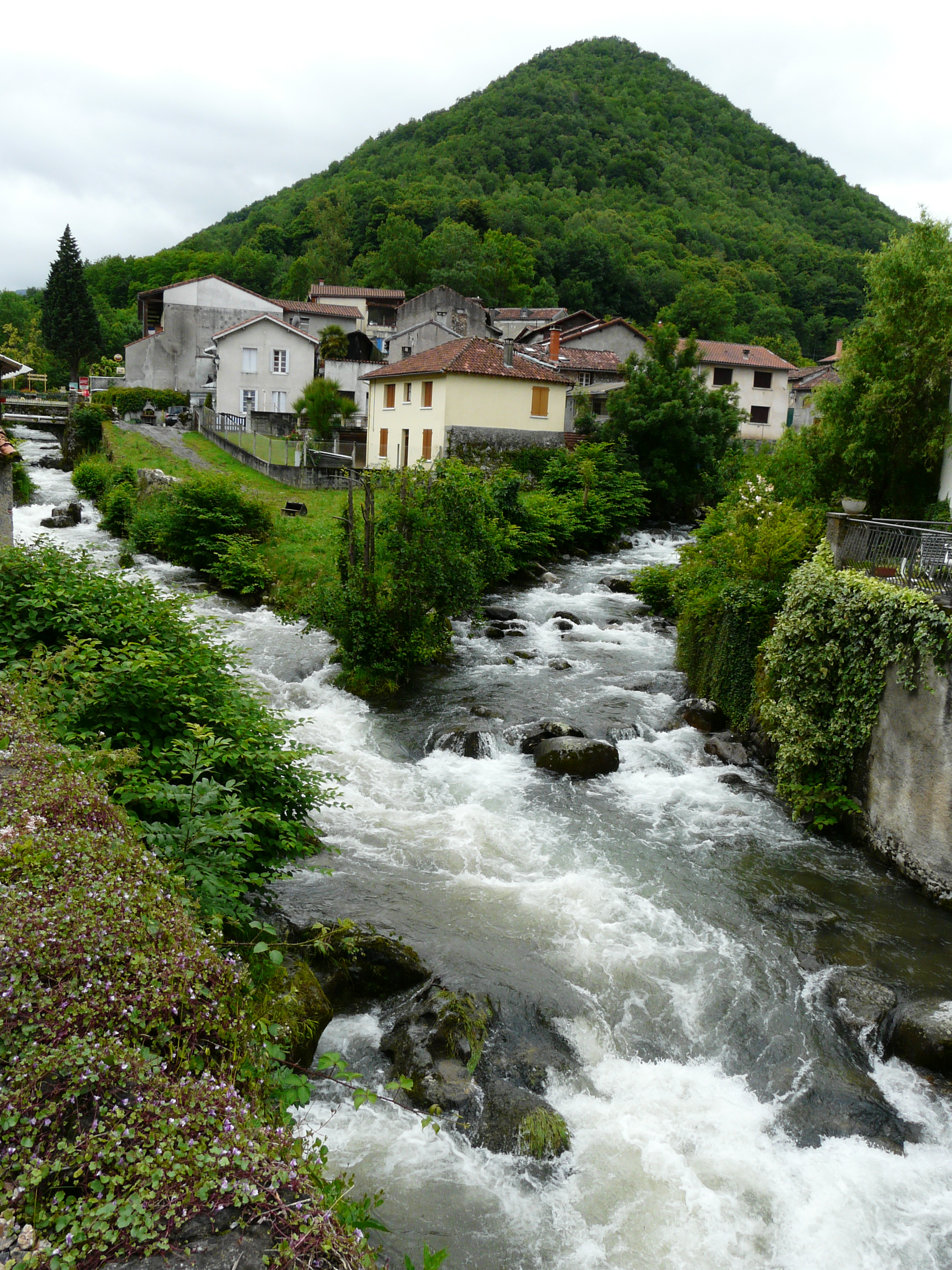
- Confluence of the Ourse de Sost (left) and the Ourse de Ferrère (right) at Mauléon

- Location within France Location within Occitanie

Location
- Country: France

Physical characteristics
- Source
  - location: Pyrenees
- Mouth
  - location: Garonne
  - coordinates: 43°01′18″N 0°36′55″E
- Length: 25.4 km (15.8 mi)
- Basin size: 139 km^{2} (54 mi^{2})

Basin features
- Progression: Garonne→ Gironde estuary→ Atlantic Ocean

The Ourse, or Ourse de Ferrère, is a French river in the Pyrenees, a tributary of the Garonne. It is 25.4 km (15.8 mi) long. It forms the Barousse valley.

== Geography ==
According to the Sandre, its mother-course is the ruisseau de Seuès which begins at 1,770 m high, NNW of the lac de Crouès.

After a few km, it is joined left by the Salabe runlet and then becomes l'Ourse de Ferrère, which joins l'Ourse de Sost at Mauléon-Barousse and then becomes l'Ourse.

It joins the Garonne left bank at 441 m high in the commune of Loures-Barousse.

The stream length of the path « Ruisseau de Seuès-Ourse de Ferrère-Ourse » is 25.4 km, for a watershed of 139 km^{2}.

L'Ourse runs through 13 communes in the Hautes-Pyrénées, all located in the canton of Mauléon-Barousse, from high to low : Ferrère, Ourde, Mauléon-Barousse, Troubat, Bramevaque, Gembrie, Antichan, Créchets, Anla, Aveux, Sarp, Izaourt, et Loures-Barousse.

It has 20 tributaries recorded by the Sandre, of which two are more than 5 km long :

- the Salabe, 6.0 km, left bank,
- l'Ourse de Sost, 12,4 km, right bank.
