= List of senators of Hautes-Pyrénées =

Location of Hautes-Pyrénées in France

Following is a list of senators of Hautes-Pyrénées, people who have represented the department of Hautes-Pyrénées in the Senate of France.

== Third Republic ==
- Jean Adnet (1876–1882)
- Louis Cazalas (1876–1882)
- Germain Dupré (1882–1891)
- Armand Deffis (1882–1892)
- Jean Dupuy (1891–1919)
- Gustave Baudens (1893–1900)
- Alphonse Pedebidou (1900–1925)
- Paul Dupuy (1920–1927)
- Louis Noguès (1925–1936)
- Manuel Fourcade (1927–1940)
- Émile Mireaux (1936–1940)

== Fourth Republic ==
- Paul Baratgin (Gauche démocratique) 1946–1959
- Pierre Bourda (Gauche démocratique) 1958–1959
- Gaston Manent (Gauche démocratique) 1948–1958

== Fifth Republic ==
- Antoine Béguère (Républicains et indépendants) 1959–1960
- Paul Baratgin (Gauche démocratique) 1959–1966
- Robert Burret (Républicains et indépendants) 1960–1965
- Pierre Bourda (Gauche démocratique) 1965–1974
- Pierre Mailhé (Gauche démocratique) 1966–1974
- René Billères (Radicaux de gauche) 1974–1983
- Hubert Peyou (Rassemblement démocratique et européen) 1974–1992
- François Abadie (Rassemblement démocratique et européen) 1983–2001
- François Fortassin (European Democratic and Social Rally group) 2001–2017
- Josette Durieu (Socialiste) 2001–2017
- Michel Pélieu (European Democratic and Social Rally group) 2017
- Viviane Artigalas (Socialist Party) from 2017
- Maryse Carrère (European Democratic and Social Rally group) from 2017
