= List of senators of Territoire de Belfort =

Location of Territoire de Belfort in France

Following is a list of senators of Territoire de Belfort, people who have represented the department of the Territoire de Belfort in the Senate of France.

== Third Republic ==
Senators for the Territoire de Belfort under the French Third Republic were:

In office		Name	Notes
1876	1882	Adolphe Thiers	Resigned in June 1876
1876	1887	François Viellard-Migeon	Replaced Adolphe Thiers on 11 June 1876; Died in office
1887	1891	Charles Fréry	Replaced François Viellard-Migeon on 2 January 1887; Died in office
1891	1904	Frédéric-Pierre Japy	Replaced Charles Fréry on 2 August 1891; Died in office
1904	1912	Philippe Berger	Replaced Frédéric-Pierre Japy on 15 May 1904; Died in office
1912	1927	Laurent Thiery	Replaced Philippe Berger on 19 May 1912
1927	1940	Louis Viellard	

== Fourth Republic ==
Senators for the Territoire de Belfort under the French Fourth Republic were:

In office		Name	Party	Parliamentary group
8 December 1946	6 November 1948	Henri Dorey	MRP	MRP
7 November 1948	26 April 1959	Marcel Boulangé	SFIO	SOC

== Fifth Republic ==
Senators for Territoire de Belfort under the French Fifth Republic:

In office		Name	Party		Parliamentary group	Notes
26 April 1959	1 October 1971	Marcel Boulangé		SFIO	SOC	
1 October 1971	2 November 1971	Jean Bailly		UDR	UDR	Named to cabinet in November 1971
3 November 1971	1 October 1980	Bernard Talon	bgcolor="#0066cc"	RPR	RPR	Replaced Jean Bailly on 3 November 1971
1 October 1980	7 September 2008	Michel Dreyfus-Schmidt		PS	SOC	Died in office on 7 September 2008
8 September 2008	30 September 2008	Yves Ackermann		PS	SOC	Replaced Michel Dreyfus-Schmidt in September 2008
1 October 2008	30 September 2014	Jean-Pierre Chevènement		MRC	RDSE	
1 October 2014	Incumbent	Cédric Perrin		UMP then LR	UMP then REP	

== Sources ==
- Liste des anciens sénateurs de la IIIème République par circonscription (in French), Sénat de France
- Liste des anciens sénateurs de la IVème République par circonscription (in French), Sénat de France
- Liste des anciens sénateurs de la Vème République par circonscription (in French), Sénat de France
- Liste par département - Territoire de Belfort (in French), Sénat de France
