= Departmental Council of Hautes-Pyrénées =

Departmental legislature in France

Departmental Council of Hautes-Pyrénées Conseil départemental des Hautes-Pyrénées
- Logo of the Council

Leadership
- President: Michel Pélieu, PRG since 27 March 2011

Meeting place
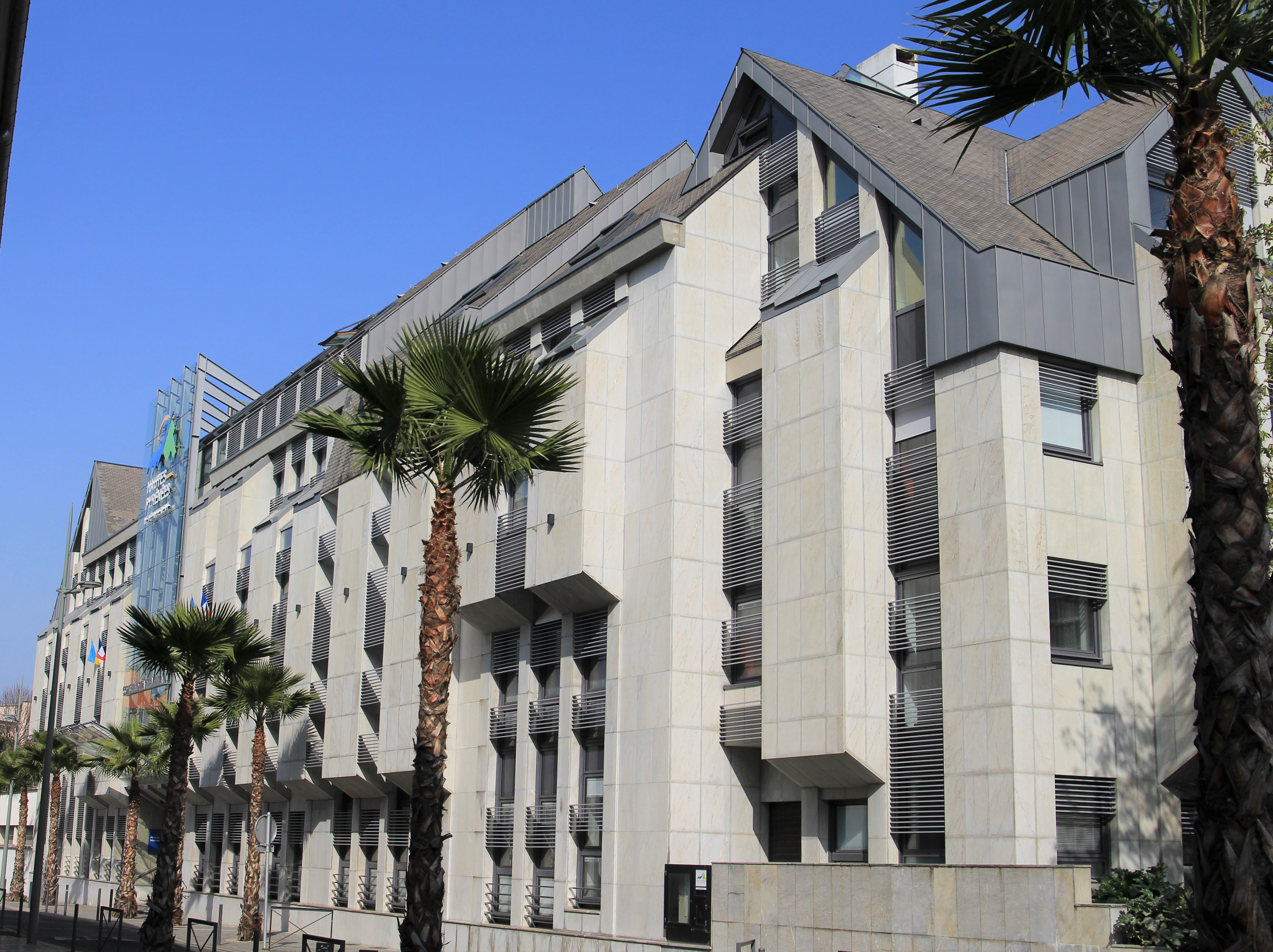
- Hôtel du département, 6 rue Gaston Manent, Tarbes

Website
- www.hautespyrenees.fr

Departmental Council of Hautes-Pyrénées (French: Conseil départemental des Hautes-Pyrénées, Occitan: Conselh departamentau deths Hauts Pirenèus, Catalan: Consell departamental dels Alts Pirineus) is the deliberative assembly of French department of Hautes-Pyrenees. It is headquartered in Tarbes.

== Executive ==
=== President ===
The departmental council of Hautes-Pyrénées is headed by Michel Pelieu (PRG) since 31 March 2011.

List of successive presidents
Period		Name	Party
1945	1967	Paul Baratgin	PRRRS
1967	1992	Hubert Peyou	PRRRS then PRG
1992	2008	Francois Fortassin	PRG
2008	2011	Josette Durieu	PS
2011	Incumbent	Michel Pélieu	PRG

=== Vice-presidents ===
List of vice-presidents of the Council (as of 2021)
Order	Name	Canton	Delegation
1st	Joëlle Abadie	La Vallée de l’Arros et des Baïses	Social solidarity, territorial action and health
2nd	Laurent Lages	La Vallée de la Barousse	Finances and territorial connectivity
3rd	Bernard Verdier	Les Coteaux	Environment and rurality
4th	Maryse Beyrié	Neste, Aure et Louron	Tourism and cross-border relations
5th	Nicole Darrieutort	La Haute-Bigorre	Roads and mobility
6th	Jean Buron	Bordères-sur-l’Échez	Youth, culture, sports and associative dynamics
7th	Pascale Péraldi	La Vallée de la Barousse	Departmental buildings and colleges
8th	Thierry Lavit	Lourdes-1	Housing, housing and urban development
9th	Monique Lamon	Les Coteaux	Human resources
10th	Frédéric Ré	Val d’Adour-Rustan-Madiranais	Employment and social and solidarity economy

== Composition ==
The departmental council of Hautes-Pyrénées includes 34 departmental councilors, elected from the 17 cantons of Hautes-Pyrénées.

Distribution of seats (as of 2021)
Party	Acronym	Seats
Majority (23 seats)
Socialist Party	PS	9
Radical Party of the Left	PRG	8
Miscellaneous right	DVG	4
French Communist Party	PCF	2
Opposition (11 seats)
Sans étiquette	SE	6
Miscellaneous right	DVD	4
Union of Democrats and Independents	UDI	1
