= Château des Comtes de Comminges =

Ruined castle in Hautes-Pyrénées, France

Coordinates: 42°58′34″N 0°34′27″E

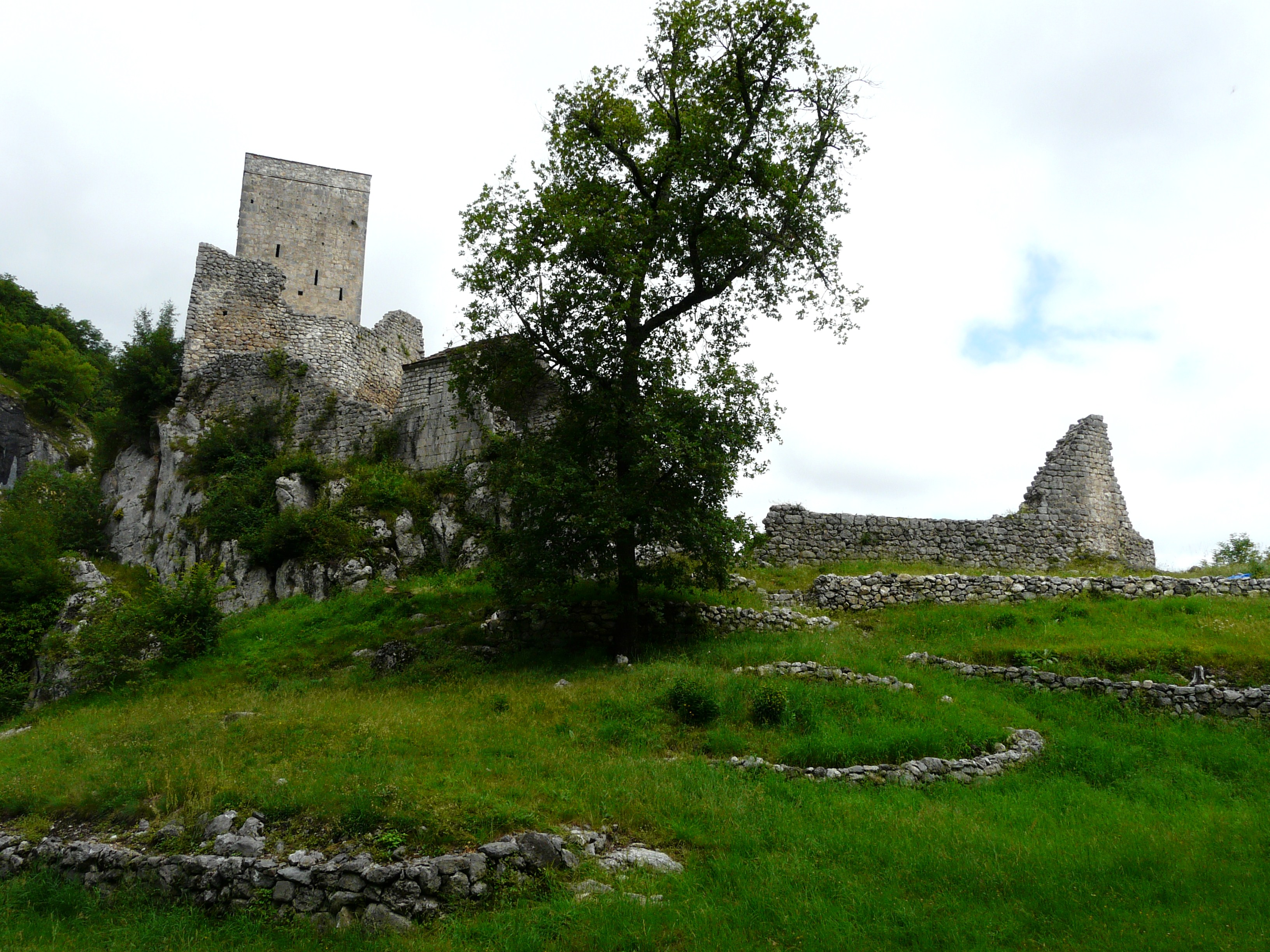
Château des Comtes de Comminges

The Château des Comtes de Comminges is a ruined castle in the commune of Bramevaque in the Hautes-Pyrénées département of France.

The castle has been listed since 1950 as a monument historique by the French Ministry of Culture.

== Description ==
A first enceinte opens into a second, which contains the remains of a large construction. Against the second enceinte is a Romanesque chapel whose apse, now gone, was covered by a vault. The barrel vault of the nave remains, made of flat stones above an archivolt decorated with blind arcades and billettes typical of the era. The keep stands at the highest point, at the centre of a terrace, from which it is entered through a semicircular arch leading to a staircase built within the thickness of the walls. The keep has two square, barrel-vaulted rooms, one above the other, and the walls rise around these rooms in seven flights. Each room is illuminated by an arrowslit. The staircase ends at the top of the keep on a terrace that has lost its parapet.

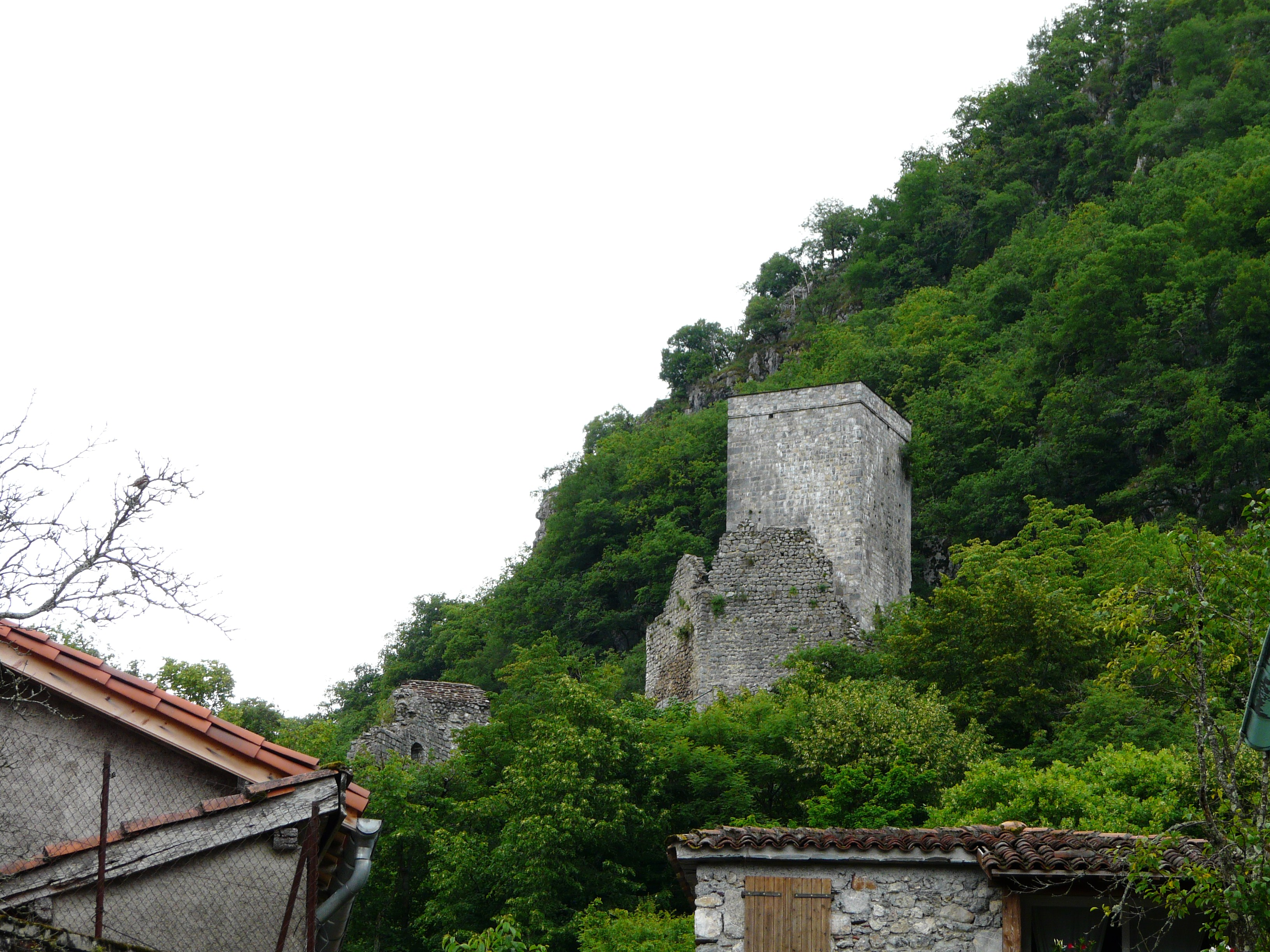
The keep seen from the village of Bramevaque

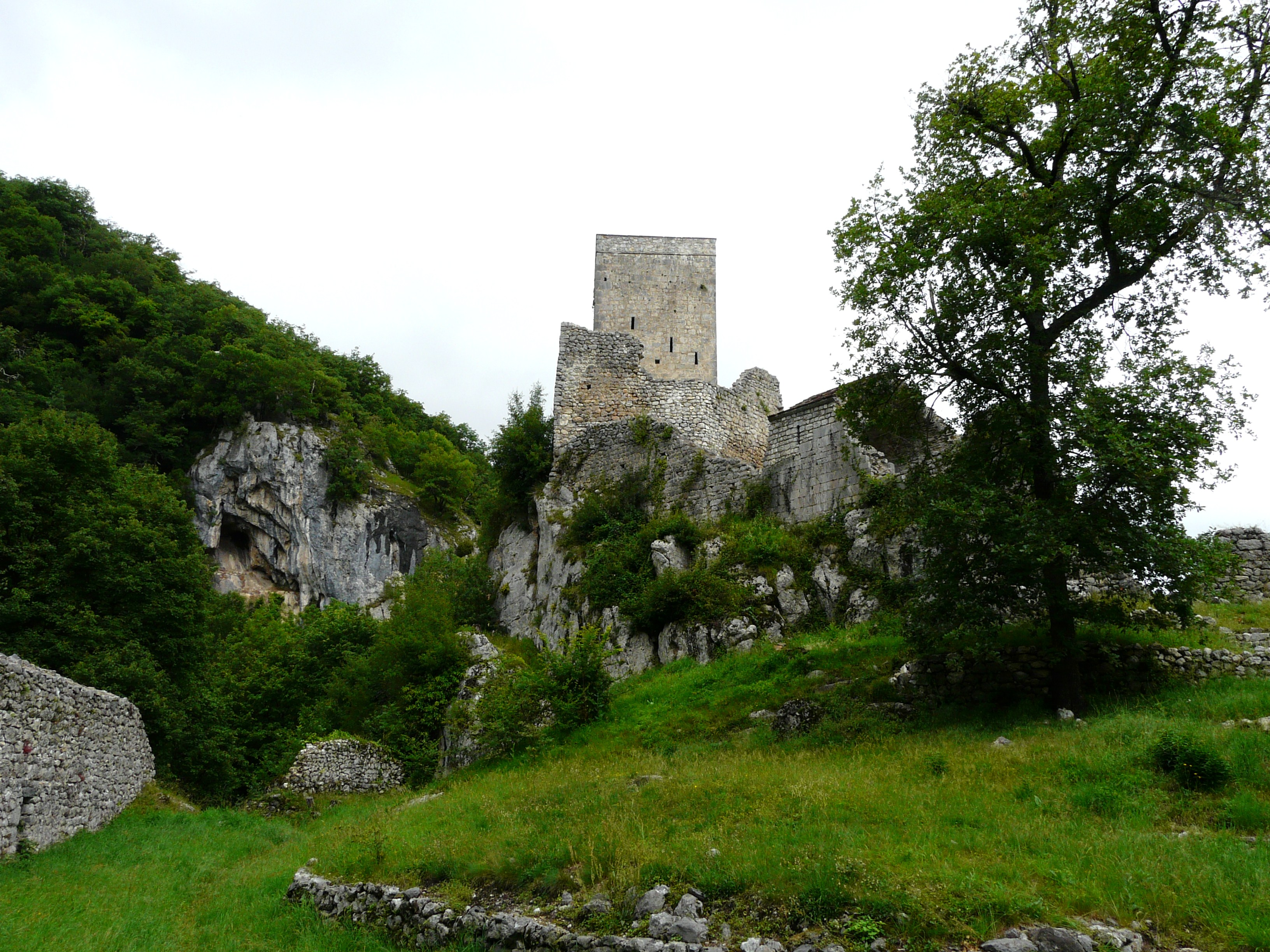
The ruins

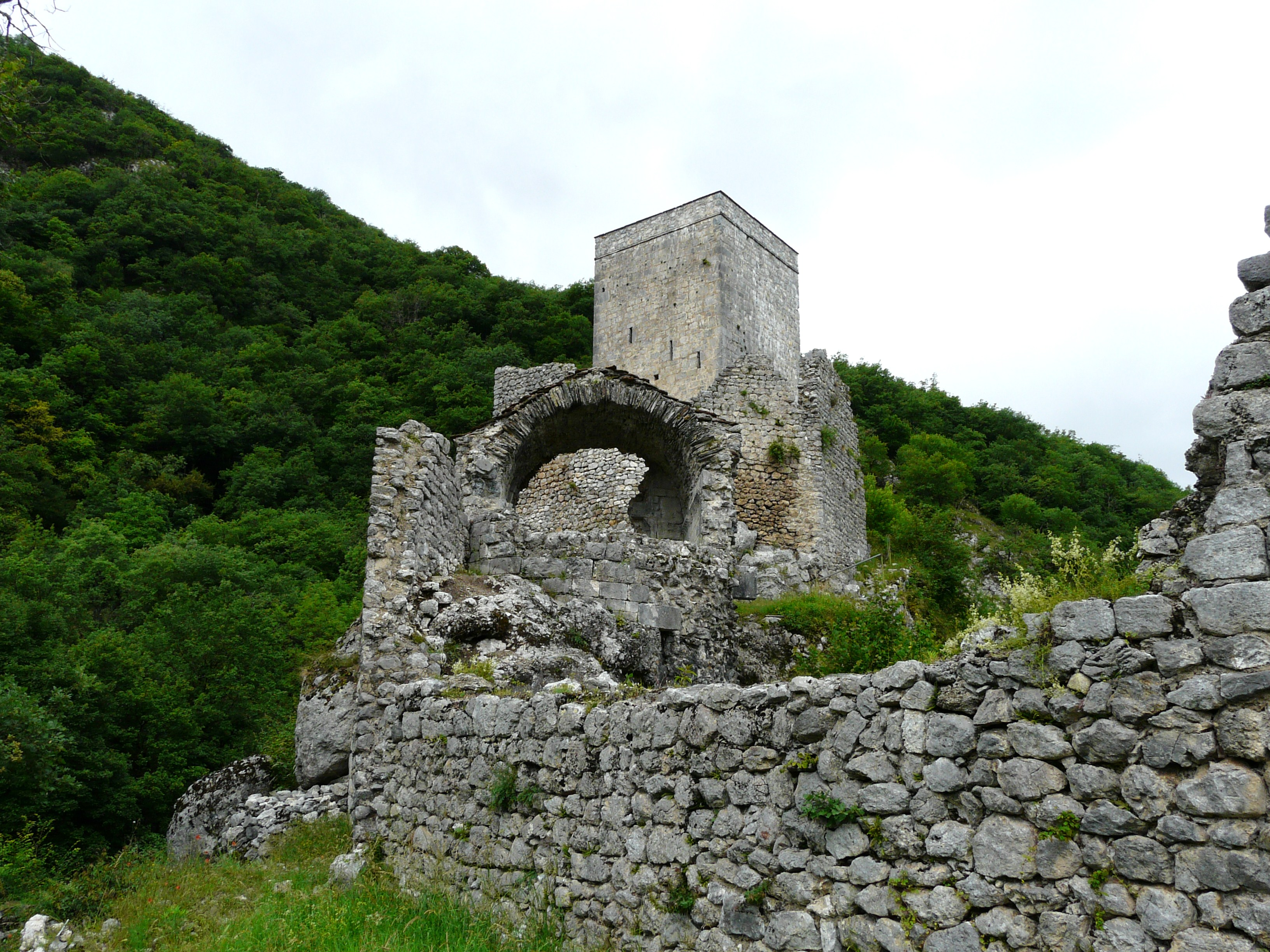

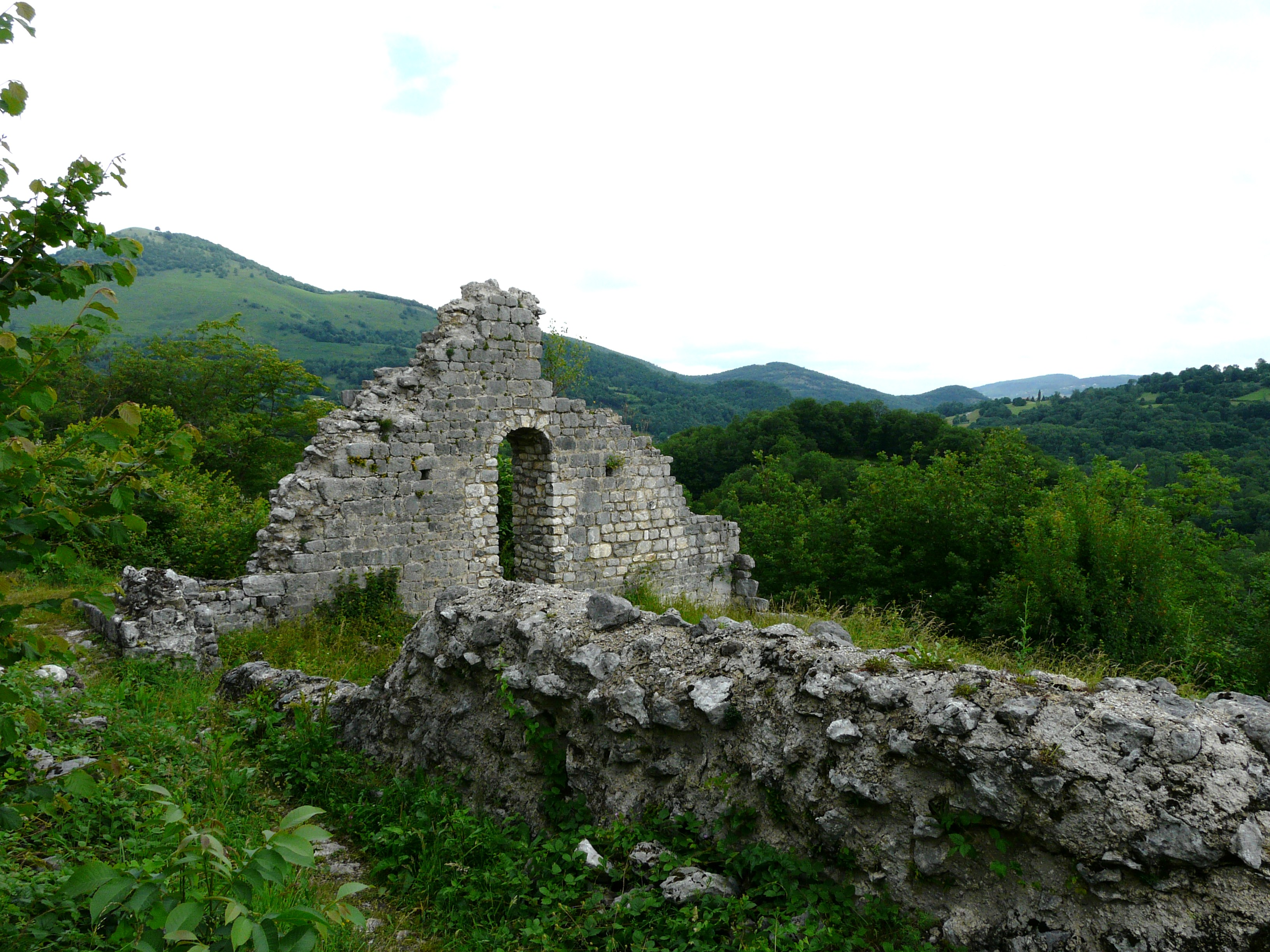

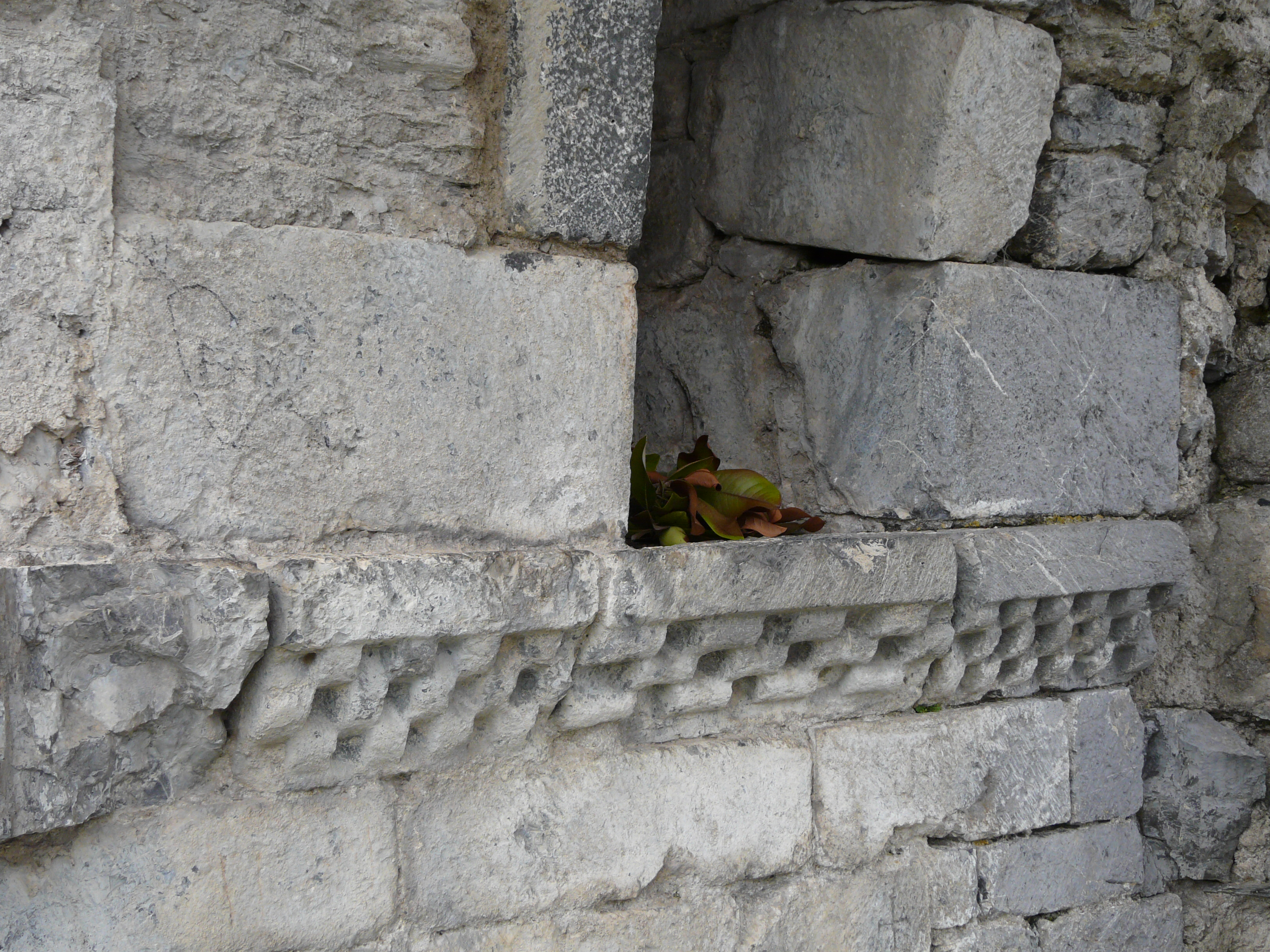
A doorstep

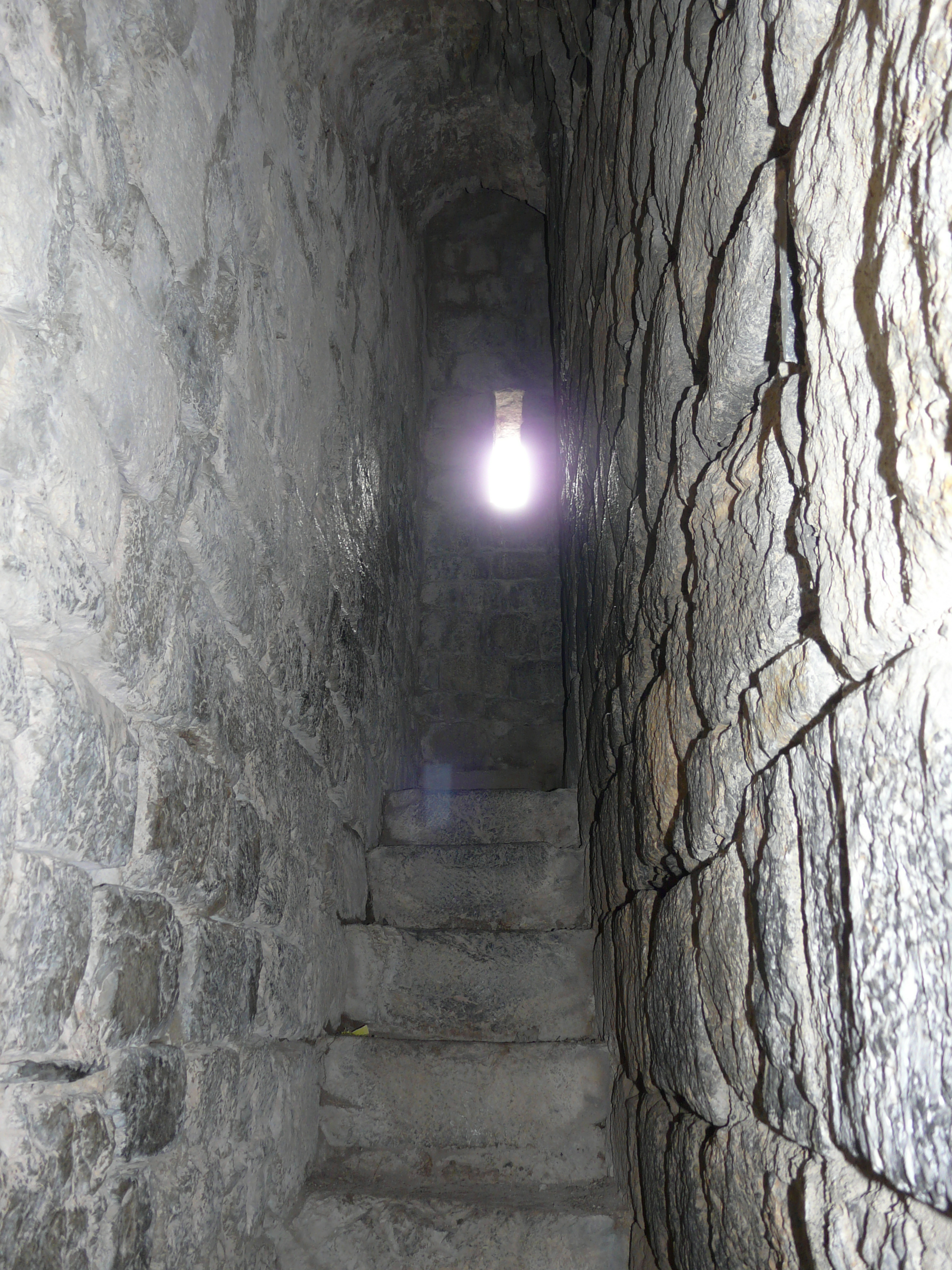
Staircase in the keep

== See also ==
- List of castles in France
