= Pélieu =

Pélieu is a surname. Notable people with the surname include:

- Claude Pélieu, French writer
- Michel Pélieu, French politician
