= François Fortassin =

French politician

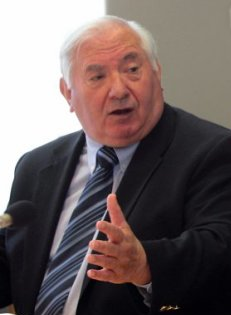
- François Fortassin

Member of the French Senate for Hautes-Pyrénées
- In office 2001–2017
- Preceded by: François Abadie
- Succeeded by: Michel Pélieu

Personal details
- Born: 2 August 1939 Sarp, France
- Died: 15 May 2017 (aged 77)
- Party: Radical Party of the Left

François Fortassin (2 August 1939 – 15 May 2017) was a French politician and a member of the Senate of France. He represented the Hautes-Pyrénées department and was a secretary of the Senate and a member of the Radical Party of the Left.
