= Departmental Council of Gers =

Departmental Legislature in France

Departmental Council of Gers Conseil départemental du Gers

Leadership
- President: Philippe Dupouy, PS since 25 January 2022

Structure
- Seats: 34
- Political groups: Government (22): PS (18); PRG (2); DVG (1); MRC (1); Opposition (12): LR (7); DVD (4); LMR (1); www.gers.fr

The Departmental Council of Gers (French: Conseil Départemental du Gers, Occitan: Conselh Departamental de Gers) is the deliberative assembly of the department of Gers in the region of Occitanie. It consists of 34 members (general councilors) from 17 cantons and its headquarters are in Auch.

The president of the General Council is Philippe Dupouy.

== See also ==
- Gers
- General councils of France
