= Samuran =

- Commune
- Coat of arms
- Location of Samuran
- Location within France Location within Occitanie
- Coordinates: 42°59′17″N 0°35′43″E
- Country: France
- Region: Occitania
- Department: Hautes-Pyrénées
- Arrondissement: Bagnères-de-Bigorre
- Canton: La Vallée de la Barousse
- Intercommunality: Neste Barousse

Government
  - Mayor (2020–2026): Olivier Tortorici
- Area^{1}: 2.55 km^{2} (0.98 sq mi)
- Elevation: 715 m (2,346 ft)
- Highest elevation: 1,044 m (3,425 ft)
- Lowest elevation: 546 m (1,791 ft)
- Population (2023): 27
  - Density: 11/km^{2} (27/sq mi)
- Time zone: UTC+01:00 (CET)
  - Summer (DST): UTC+02:00 (CEST)
- INSEE/Postal code: 65402 /65370
- ^{1} French Land Register data, which excludes lakes, ponds, glaciers > 1 km^{2} (0.386 sq mi or 247 acres) and river estuaries.

Samuran (French pronunciation: [samyʁɑ̃]) is a commune in the Hautes-Pyrénées department in south-western France.

== See also ==
- Communes of the Hautes-Pyrénées department
- Barousse valley
