= Bernard Talon =

French politician (1930–2022)

Member of the French Senate
- In office 3 November 1971 – 1 October 1980
- Preceded by: Jean-Marie Bailly
- Succeeded by: Michel Dreyfus-Schmidt
- Constituency: Territoire de Belfort

Personal details
- Born: 16 June 1930 France
- Died: 9 March 2022 (aged 91) France
- Party: RPR

Bernard Talon (16 June 1930 – 9 March 2022) was a French politician. A member of the Rally for the Republic, he served in the Senate from 1971 to 1980. He died on 9 March 2022, at the age of 91.
