= Siradan =

Commune in south-western France

- Commune
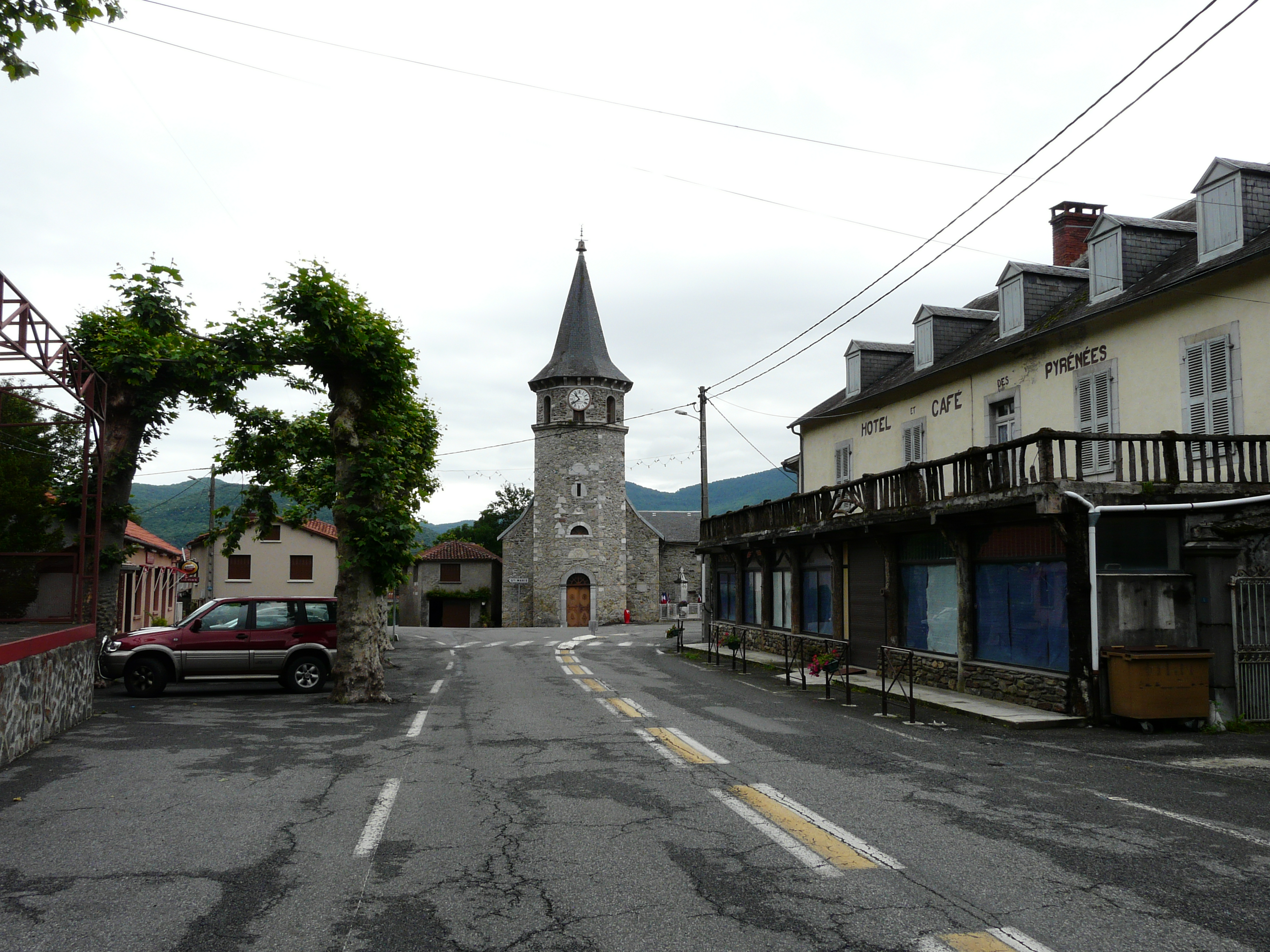
- The village of Siradan

- Coat of arms
- Location of Siradan
- Location within France Location within Occitanie
- Coordinates: 42°58′15″N 0°36′47″E
- Country: France
- Region: Occitania
- Department: Hautes-Pyrénées
- Arrondissement: Bagnères-de-Bigorre
- Canton: La Vallée de la Barousse
- Intercommunality: Neste Barousse

Government
  - Mayor (2020–2026): Roman Demange
- Area^{1}: 2.74 km^{2} (1.06 sq mi)
- Elevation: 481 m (1,578 ft)
- Highest elevation: 1,027 m (3,369 ft)
- Lowest elevation: 459 m (1,506 ft)
- Population (2023): 287
  - Density: 105/km^{2} (271/sq mi)
- Time zone: UTC+01:00 (CET)
  - Summer (DST): UTC+02:00 (CEST)
- INSEE/Postal code: 65427 /65370
- ^{1} French Land Register data, which excludes lakes, ponds, glaciers > 1 km^{2} (0.386 sq mi or 247 acres) and river estuaries.

Siradan (French pronunciation: [siʁadɑ̃]) is a commune in the Hautes-Pyrénées department in south-western France.

== See also ==
- Communes of the Hautes-Pyrénées department
- Barousse valley
