= Florian Bouquet =

French politician (born 1977)

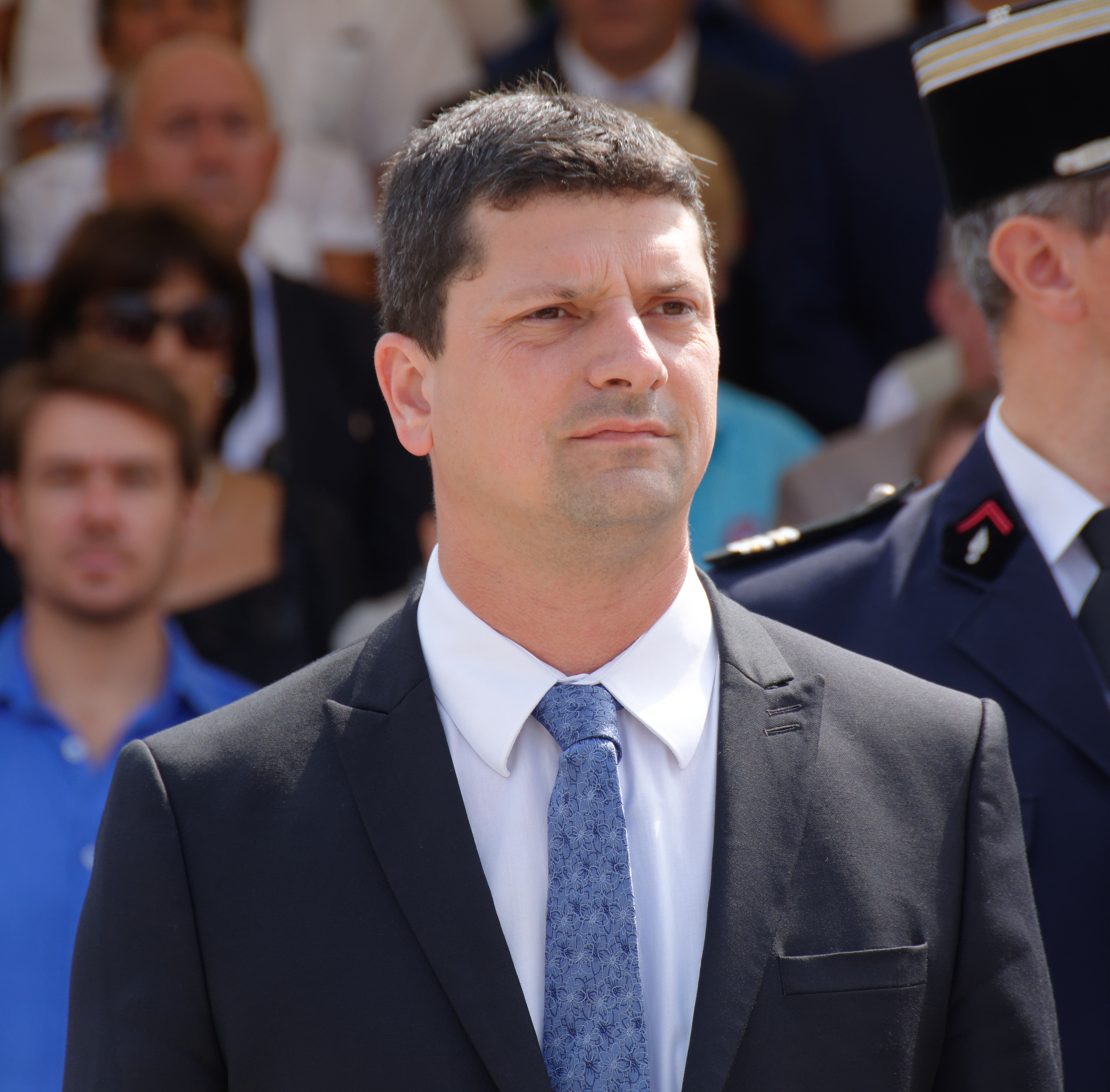
- Bouquet in July 2015

President of the Departmental Council of Territoire de Belfort
- Incumbent
- Assumed office 3 April 2015
- Preceded by: Yves Ackermann

Personal details
- Born: 15 August 1977 (age 48)
- Party: The Republicans
- Florian Bouquet's voice Recorded on 17 June 2023

Florian Bouquet (born 15 August 1977) is a French politician serving as a member of the Departmental Council of Territoire de Belfort since 2011. He has served as president of the council since 2015.
