= Cazarilh =

- Commune
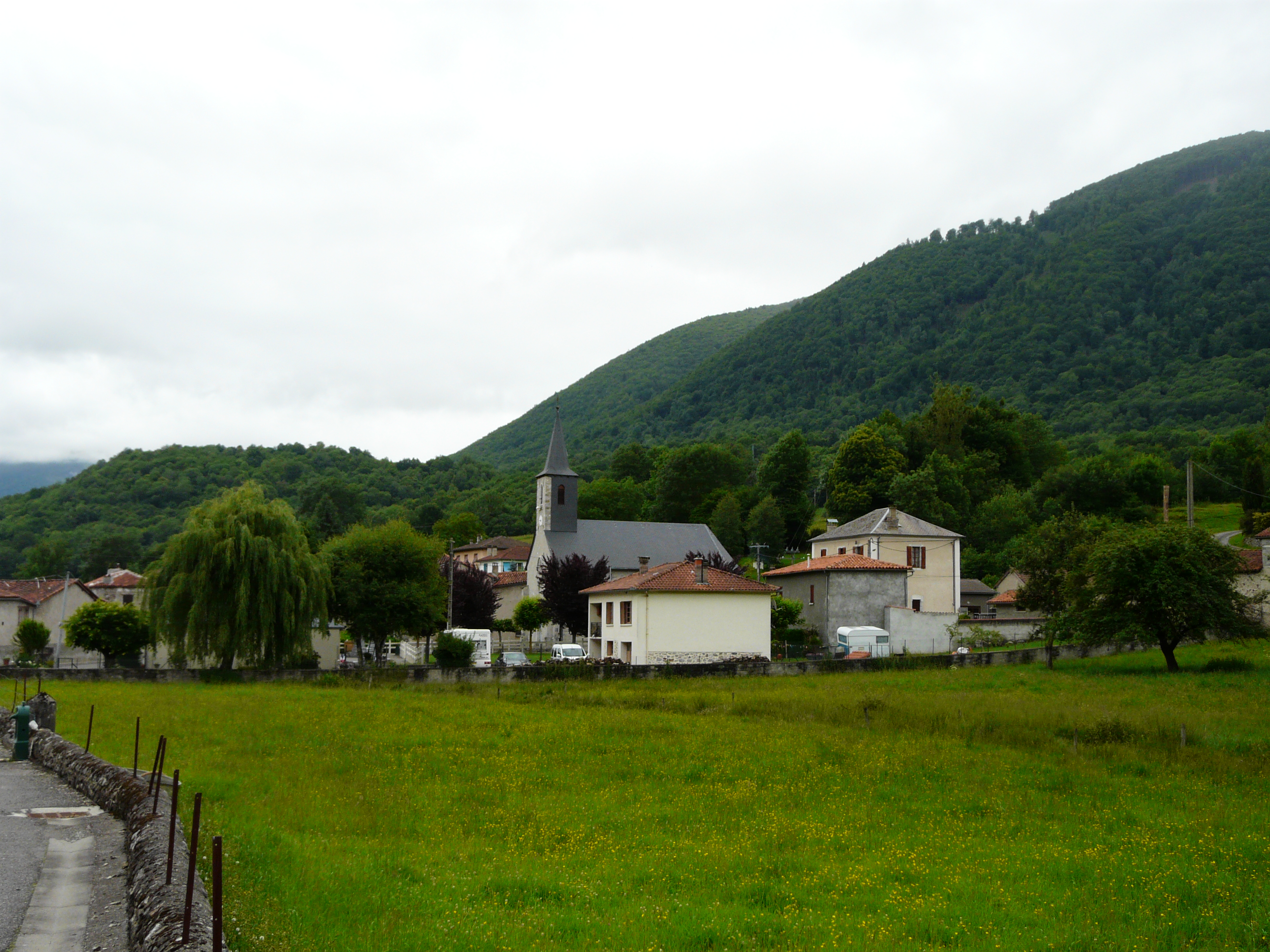
- The village of Cazarilh

- Coat of arms
- Location of Cazarilh
- Location within France Location within Occitanie
- Coordinates: 42°57′30″N 0°34′56″E
- Country: France
- Region: Occitania
- Department: Hautes-Pyrénées
- Arrondissement: Bagnères-de-Bigorre
- Canton: La Vallée de la Barousse
- Intercommunality: Neste Barousse

Government
  - Mayor (2020–2026): Sylvain Savazzi
- Area^{1}: 3.06 km^{2} (1.18 sq mi)
- Elevation: 600 m (2,000 ft)
- Highest elevation: 1,587 m (5,207 ft)
- Lowest elevation: 578 m (1,896 ft)
- Population (2023): 62
  - Density: 20/km^{2} (52/sq mi)
- Time zone: UTC+01:00 (CET)
  - Summer (DST): UTC+02:00 (CEST)
- INSEE/Postal code: 65139 /65370
- ^{1} French Land Register data, which excludes lakes, ponds, glaciers > 1 km^{2} (0.386 sq mi or 247 acres) and river estuaries.

Cazarilh (French pronunciation: [kazaʁij]; Occitan: Casarilh) is a commune in the Hautes-Pyrénées department in south-western France.

== See also ==
- Communes of the Hautes-Pyrénées department
- Barousse valley
