= Barousse valley =

The Barousse is a small region of southwestern France, including the valley of the Ourse, a left tributary of the Garonne, in the Hautes-Pyrénées, and the smaller valley of Siradan.

The main towns are Loures-Barousse and Mauleon-Barousse.

== Toponymy ==
Its name comes from the pre-Latin Gascon language Barroça, which is based on the Basque language root ibar which means 'valley' and on a variant of the toponymic suffix -oç. Others have seen its origin in the name of the Ourse river or meaning Valley of the Bear.

The Basque language influence is clearly discernible in toponyms such as Ourse, Loures-Barousse, Izaourt, Sarp, Ourde, Esbareich, Sost, etc. Then the Romans left their marks with the names of estates such as Antichan and Samuran which eventually became villages.

Finally, one can hear the Gascon language in the names Créchets (small cliff), Bramevaque (mooing cow), Troubat (found?) or Cazarilh (small hamlet).

The name of Ilheu is also reminiscent of the valley of Ilhéou.

== Geography ==
=== Topography ===
Barousse corresponds mainly to the basin of the Ourse river in the northeast of the Moun Né (2,147 m (7,044 ft)) between the valley de la Pique, to the south, and the valley of Nistos to the north. It flows into the valley of the Garonne near Barbazan. The small valley of Siradan, which leads directly to the Garonne from the plateau Cazarilh, is also part of the Barousse since no significant barrier separates it from the main valley. The valley is not a means of communication even if the port Balès (1755 m) can reach the valley of Oueil to the south.

=== Geology ===
About 50,000 to 60,000 years ago the valley was overrun by the glacier of the Garonne as evidenced by impressive glacial deposits. This created a narrowing at mid-valley, resulting in the lock of Troubat.

The upper valley is covered with forests, while the central part is made up of grasslands. Within the karst landscape, there exists the gulf of Saoule in which the Ourse of Ferrère torrent plunges in cascades.

Old quarries extracted limestone (dolomitic) at Thèbe. To the west of mount Sacon, magnesium ore has been extracted to fuel the steel plant of Marignac.

The water source of Saint-Nérée, upstream of Ferrère, is also subject to commercial exploitation.

== History ==
The caves of Troubat show traces of early settlements. Excavations have revealed flints, spears, a propeller, spears using antler horns, all dating from 15,000 to 8,000 years ago. Numerous remains of snails have been discovered: snails were consumed by the Pyreneans at the time.

In the Middle Ages, Barousse broke way from the Comminges to join the county of Aure and form the country of the Quatre-Vallées ("Four Valleys").
