= Cédric Perrin =

French politician (born 1974)

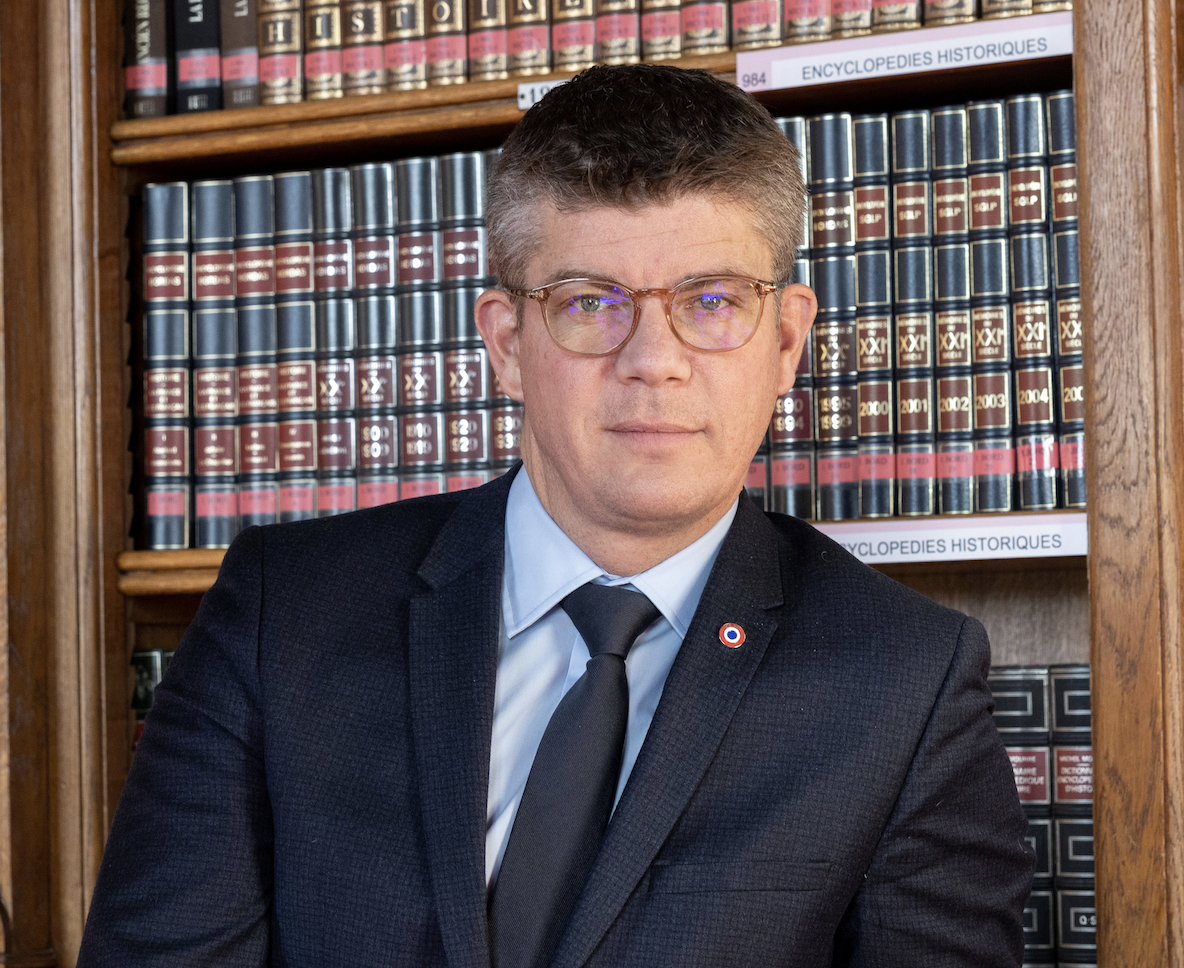
- Perrin in 2023

Senator for the Territoire de Belfort
- Incumbent
- Assumed office 1 October 2014
- Preceded by: Jean-Pierre Chevènement

Mayor of Beaucourt
- In office 16 March 2008 – 14 October 2017
- Preceded by: Antoine Morandini
- Succeeded by: Thierry Bietry

Personal details
- Born: 20 January 1974 (age 52) Belfort, France
- Party: The Republicans (2015–present)
- Other political affiliations: Rally for the Republic (until 2002); Union for a Popular Movement (2002–2015)
- Education: University of Strasbourg
- Cédric Perrin's voice Recorded on 17 June 2023

Cédric Perrin (French pronunciation: [sedʁik pɛʁɛ̃]; born 20 January 1974) is a French politician who has represented the Territoire de Belfort in the Senate since 2014. He is a member of The Republicans (LR), formerly the Union for a Popular Movement (UMP). Since 26 October 2023, he has presided over the bicameral Délégation parlementaire au renseignement, which supervises France's three main intelligence agencies.

== Early life ==
A native of Belfort, Perrin grew up in Beaucourt. He is an alumnus of the University of Strasbourg, from which he graduated in private law.

A jurist by occupation, he was elected to the General Council of Territoire de Belfort in 2001 for the canton of Beaucourt, at age 27. He held the seat until redistricting in 2015, when the canton was merged into the canton of Delle and he chose not to run for reelection.

== Political career ==
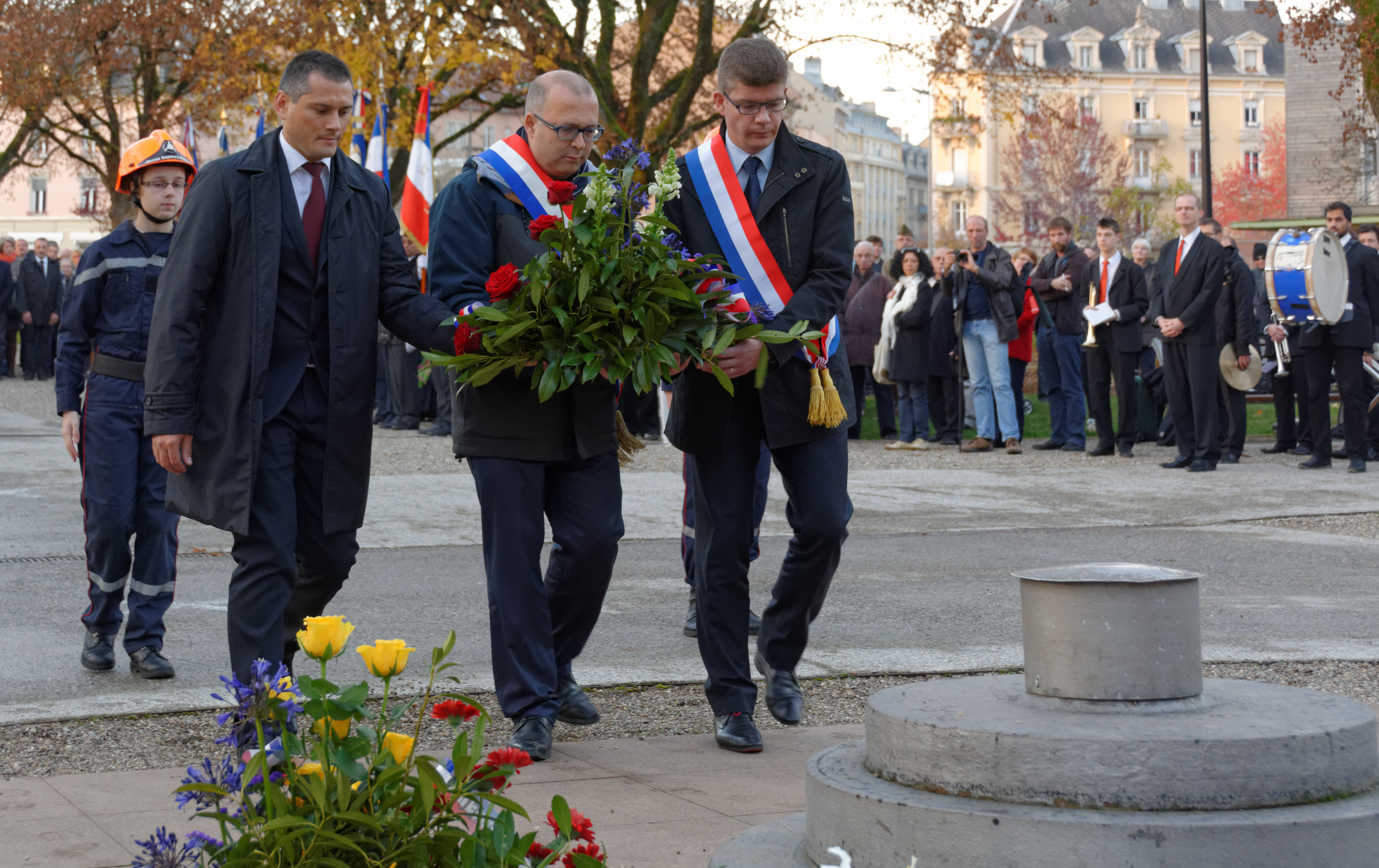
Cédric Perrin (right) and Damien Meslot (centre), deputy of the Territoire de Belfort and Mayor of Belfort, at a ceremony on 22 November 2014

Perrin was Third Deputy Mayor of Beaucourt from 2001 to 2008, when he was elected to the mayorship, which he held until his resignation in 2017. In 2002, 2007 and 2012, he was Damien Meslot's substitute for the 1st constituency of the Territoire de Belfort seat in the National Assembly.

Perrin was first elected to the Senate in 2014 with 52.5% of the first-round vote. He succeeded 2002 presidential candidate Jean-Pierre Chevènement in office. Perrin was reelected to a second term in 2020 with 72.2% of the first-round vote.

In 2021, he was returned to the Departmental Council of Territoire de Belfort for the canton of Delle while keeping his Senate term.

On 6 October 2023, Perrin was elected to preside over the Senate's Committee on Foreign Affairs, Defence and the Armed Forces. Since 26 October 2023, he has also presided over the Délégation parlementaire au renseignement, the eight-member (four deputies, four senators) body tasked with supervising France's three main intelligence agencies (DGSE, DGSI, DRI). He succeeded deputy Sacha Houlié for the 2023–2024 term.
