= Ourde =

- Commune
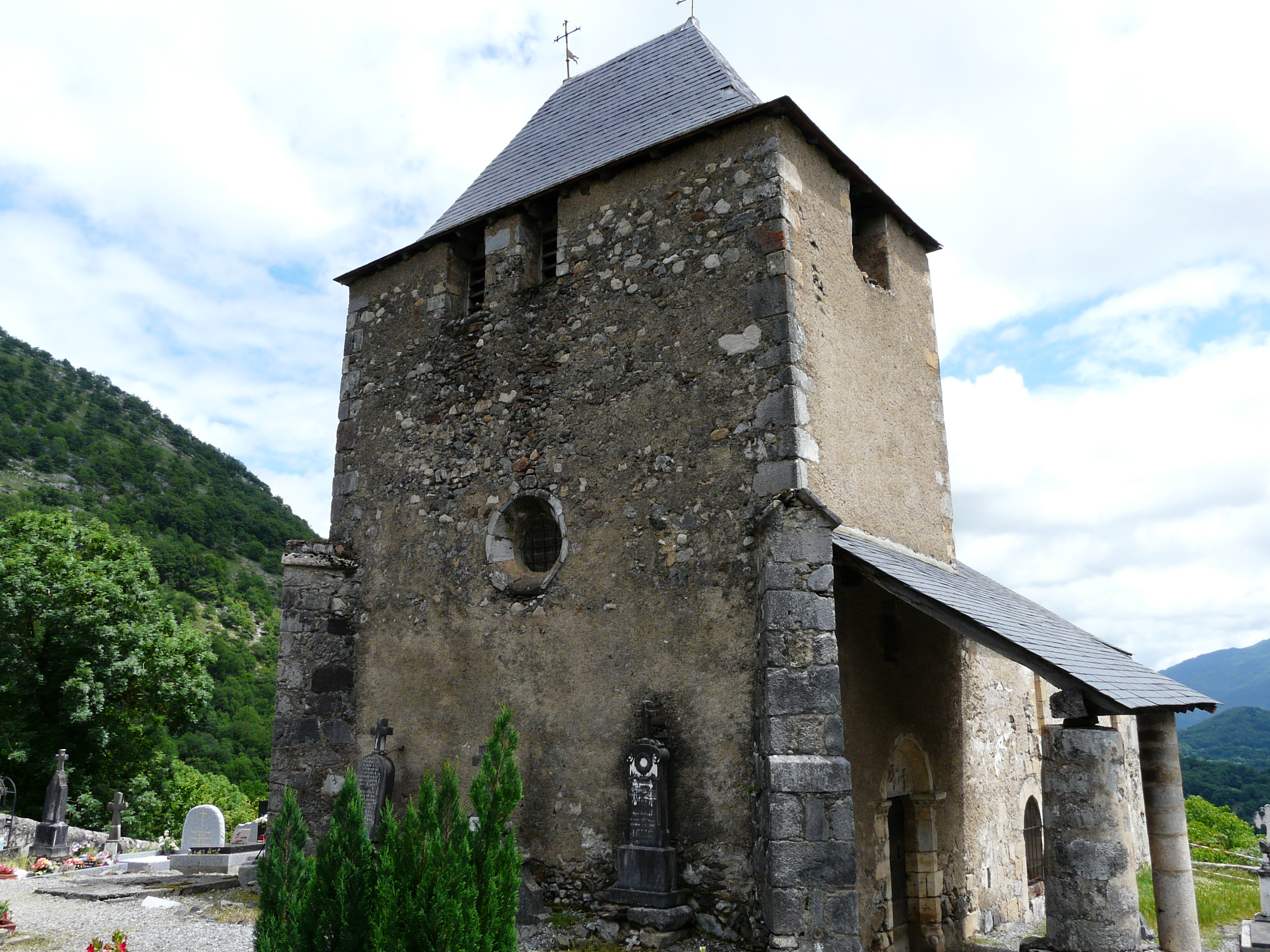
- The church of Saint-Martin

- Coat of arms
- Location of Ourde
- Location within France Location within Occitanie
- Coordinates: 42°57′36″N 0°33′21″E
- Country: France
- Region: Occitania
- Department: Hautes-Pyrénées
- Arrondissement: Bagnères-de-Bigorre
- Canton: La Vallée de la Barousse
- Intercommunality: Neste Barousse

Government
  - Mayor (2020–2026): Jean-Louis Ribes
- Area^{1}: 5.60 km^{2} (2.16 sq mi)
- Elevation: 755 m (2,477 ft)
- Highest elevation: 1,543 m (5,062 ft)
- Lowest elevation: 592 m (1,942 ft)
- Population (2023): 43
  - Density: 7.7/km^{2} (20/sq mi)
- Time zone: UTC+01:00 (CET)
  - Summer (DST): UTC+02:00 (CEST)
- INSEE/Postal code: 65347 /65370
- ^{1} French Land Register data, which excludes lakes, ponds, glaciers > 1 km^{2} (0.386 sq mi or 247 acres) and river estuaries.

Ourde (French pronunciation: [uʁd]; Occitan: Orda) is a commune in the Hautes-Pyrénées department in south-western France.

== Population ==
Population History
Year	Pop.	±% p.a.
1968	41	—
1975	38	−1.08%
1982	31	−2.87%
1990	31	+0.00%
1999	25	−2.36%
2007	30	+2.31%
2012	32	+1.30%
2017	40	+4.56%
2023	43	+1.21%
Source: INSEE

== See also ==
- Communes of the Hautes-Pyrénées department
- Barousse valley
