= Izaourt =

- Commune
- Coat of arms
- Location of Izaourt
- Location within France Location within Occitanie
- Coordinates: 43°01′01″N 0°36′02″E
- Country: France
- Region: Occitania
- Department: Hautes-Pyrénées
- Arrondissement: Bagnères-de-Bigorre
- Canton: La Vallée de la Barousse
- Intercommunality: Neste Barousse

Government
  - Mayor (2020–2026): Odile Sabatier
- Area^{1}: 2.41 km^{2} (0.93 sq mi)
- Highest elevation: 746 m (2,448 ft)
- Lowest elevation: 444 m (1,457 ft)
- Population (2023): 256
  - Density: 106/km^{2} (275/sq mi)
- Time zone: UTC+01:00 (CET)
  - Summer (DST): UTC+02:00 (CEST)
- INSEE/Postal code: 65230 /65370
- ^{1} French Land Register data, which excludes lakes, ponds, glaciers > 1 km^{2} (0.386 sq mi or 247 acres) and river estuaries.

Izaourt is a commune in the Hautes-Pyrénées department in south-western France.

== See also ==
- Communes of the Hautes-Pyrénées department
- Barousse valley
