= Mauléon-Barousse =

- Commune
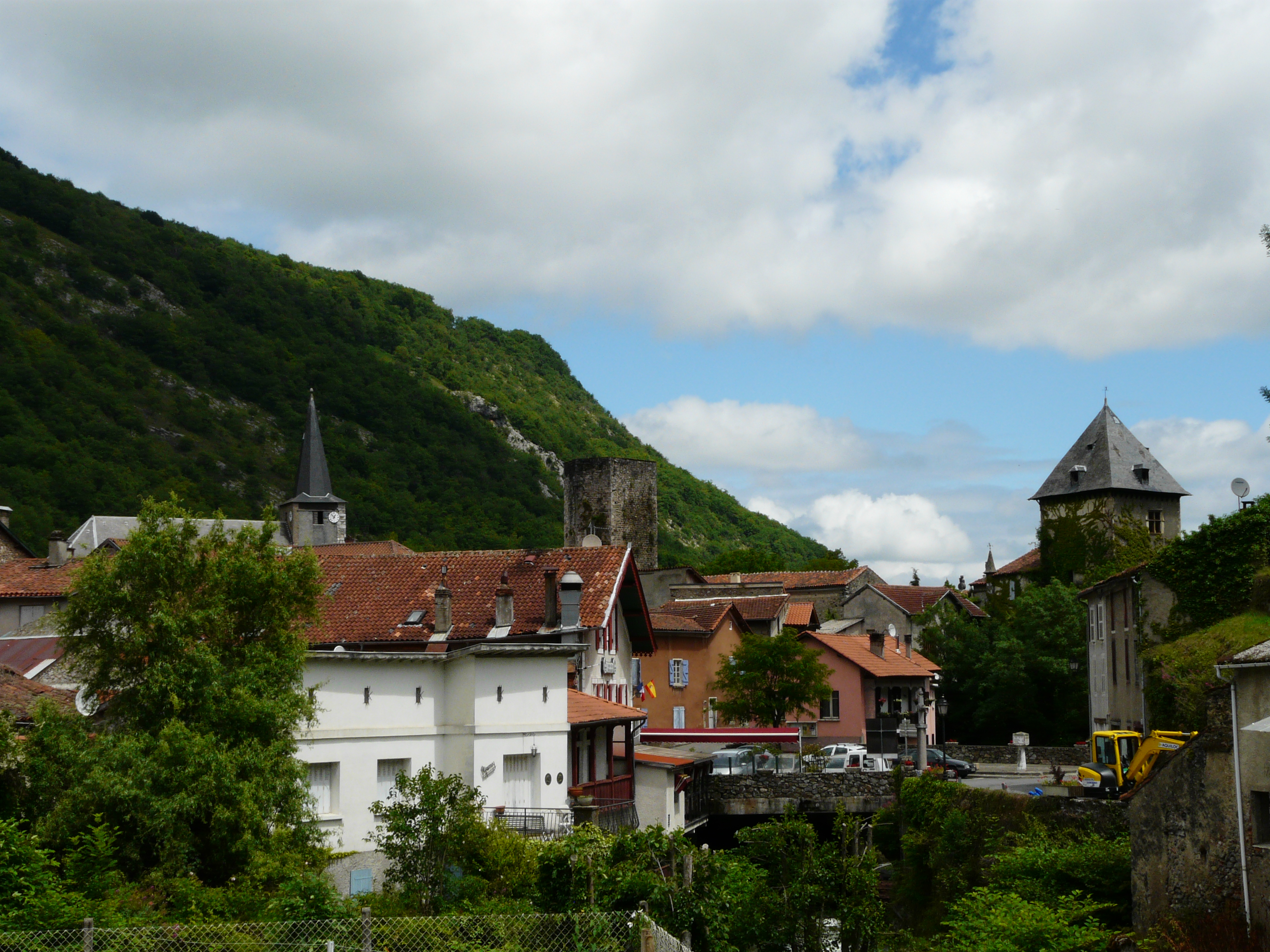
- The village of Mauléon-Barousse

- Coat of arms
- Location of Mauléon-Barousse
- Location within France Location within Occitanie
- Coordinates: 42°57′37″N 0°34′07″E
- Country: France
- Region: Occitania
- Department: Hautes-Pyrénées
- Arrondissement: Bagnères-de-Bigorre
- Canton: La Vallée de la Barousse
- Intercommunality: Neste Barousse

Government
  - Mayor (2020–2026): Ginette Barthié-Fortassin
- Area^{1}: 5.49 km^{2} (2.12 sq mi)
- Elevation: 580 m (1,900 ft)
- Highest elevation: 1,604 m (5,262 ft)
- Lowest elevation: 557 m (1,827 ft)
- Population (2023): 102
  - Density: 18.6/km^{2} (48.1/sq mi)
- Time zone: UTC+01:00 (CET)
  - Summer (DST): UTC+02:00 (CEST)
- INSEE/Postal code: 65305 /65370
- ^{1} French Land Register data, which excludes lakes, ponds, glaciers > 1 km^{2} (0.386 sq mi or 247 acres) and river estuaries.

Mauléon-Barousse (French pronunciation: [moleɔ̃ baʁus]; Occitan: Maulion de Varossa) is a commune in the Hautes-Pyrénées department in south-western France.

== Geography ==
=== Climate ===
Mauléon-Barousse has an oceanic climate (Köppen climate classification Cfb). The average annual temperature in Mauléon-Barousse is 12.3 °C (54.1 °F). The average annual rainfall is 1,121.4 mm (44.15 in) with November as the wettest month. The temperatures are highest on average in August, at around 19.8 °C (67.6 °F), and lowest in January, at around 5.3 °C (41.5 °F). The highest temperature ever recorded in Mauléon-Barousse was 40.0 °C (104.0 °F) on 26 August 2010; the coldest temperature ever recorded was −14.3 °C (6.3 °F) on 8 February 2012.

Climate data for Mauléon-Barousse (1981−2010 normals, extremes 1995−2015)
Month	Jan	Feb	Mar	Apr	May	Jun	Jul	Aug	Sep	Oct	Nov	Dec	Year
Record high °C (°F)	23.0 (73.4)	24.5 (76.1)	28.0 (82.4)	30.0 (86.0)	35.0 (95.0)	40.0 (104.0)	37.0 (98.6)	40.0 (104.0)	35.0 (95.0)	31.0 (87.8)	27.0 (80.6)	23.0 (73.4)	40.0 (104.0)
Mean daily maximum °C (°F)	9.6 (49.3)	10.9 (51.6)	14.7 (58.5)	16.2 (61.2)	19.7 (67.5)	23.4 (74.1)	24.9 (76.8)	25.5 (77.9)	22.3 (72.1)	19.1 (66.4)	12.5 (54.5)	9.6 (49.3)	17.4 (63.3)
Daily mean °C (°F)	5.3 (41.5)	6.1 (43.0)	9.2 (48.6)	10.9 (51.6)	14.5 (58.1)	18.2 (64.8)	19.6 (67.3)	19.8 (67.6)	16.8 (62.2)	13.8 (56.8)	8.1 (46.6)	5.4 (41.7)	12.3 (54.1)
Mean daily minimum °C (°F)	0.9 (33.6)	1.3 (34.3)	3.7 (38.7)	5.6 (42.1)	9.2 (48.6)	13.0 (55.4)	14.4 (57.9)	14.2 (57.6)	11.2 (52.2)	8.5 (47.3)	3.7 (38.7)	1.2 (34.2)	7.3 (45.1)
Record low °C (°F)	−11.5 (11.3)	−14.3 (6.3)	−12.0 (10.4)	−2.0 (28.4)	0.0 (32.0)	3.5 (38.3)	6.0 (42.8)	5.0 (41.0)	2.5 (36.5)	−4.0 (24.8)	−7.5 (18.5)	−9.0 (15.8)	−14.3 (6.3)
Average precipitation mm (inches)	106.9 (4.21)	78.1 (3.07)	92.3 (3.63)	109.5 (4.31)	117.3 (4.62)	79.8 (3.14)	74.3 (2.93)	72.1 (2.84)	73.6 (2.90)	76.3 (3.00)	138.3 (5.44)	102.9 (4.05)	1,121.4 (44.15)
Average precipitation days (≥ 1.0 mm)	11.3	10.4	10.7	13.3	13.3	9.5	9.2	9.4	8.9	10.6	12.9	11.8	131.2
Source: Météo-France

== See also ==
- Communes of the Hautes-Pyrénées department
- Barousse valley
