= Departmental Council of Territoire de Belfort =

Departmental legislature in France

Departmental Council of Territoire de Belfort Conseil départemental du Territoire de Belfort
- Logo of the Council

Leadership
- President: Florian Bouquet, LR

Meeting place
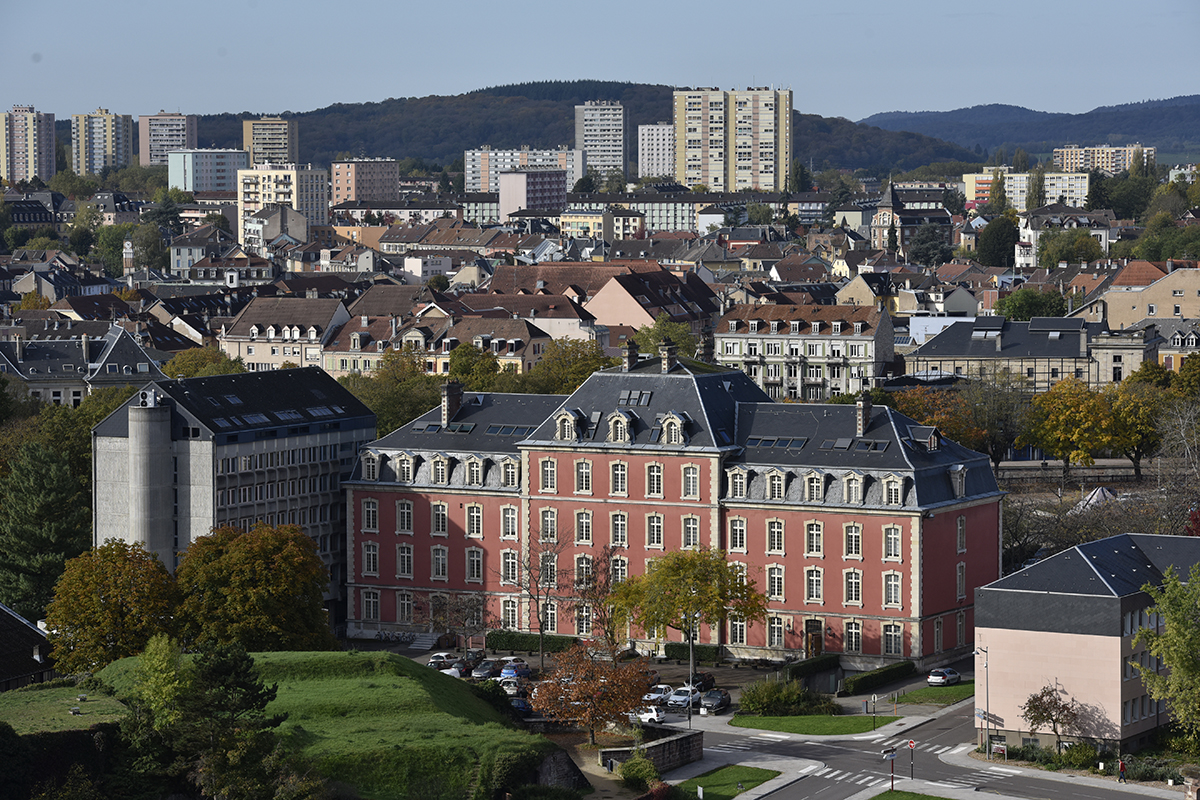
- Hôtel du Département, Belfort

Website
- www.territoiredebelfort.fr

The Departmental Council of Territoire de Belfort (French: Conseil Départemental du Territoire de Belfort) is the deliberative assembly of the Territoire de Belfort department in the region of Bourgogne-Franche-Comté. It consists of 18 members (departmental councilors) from 9 cantons.

The President of the Departmental Council is Florian Bouquet.

== Elected members ==
=== President ===
List of successive presidents
Term		Name	Party
1908	1914	Charles Schneider	RAD
1915	1927	Laurent Thiery	RAD
1930	1940	Christophe Klopfenstein	RAD
1943	1945	Émile Lardier	FR
1945	1951	Christophe Klopfenstein	RAD
1955	1958	Paul Robert	MRP
1965	1967	Xavier Bauer	DVD
1970	1976	Jean-Marie Bailly	UDR
1977	1982	Denis Maire	PS
1982	1993	Christian Proust	PS
1993	2002	Christian Proust	MDC
2002	2004	Christian Proust	MRC
2004	2015	Yves Ackermann	PS
2015	Incumbent	Florian Bouquet	LR

=== Vice-Presidents ===
The President of the Departmental Council is assisted by 5 vice-presidents chosen from among the departmental advisers. Each of them has a delegation of authority.

List of vice-presidents of the Territoire de Belfort Departmental Council (as of 2021)
Order	Name	Party	Canton	Delegation
1st	Marie-Hélène Ivol	LR	Belfort-2	Elderly and disabled
2nd	Didier Vallverdu	LR	Giromagny	Roads, mobility, environment, agriculture and forests
3rd	Loubna Kefti-Charif	LR	Belfort-3	Integration, housing and e-administration
4th	Pierre Carles	DVD	Valdoie	Land use planning and development, housing and urban projects
5th	Anaïs Monnier Von Aesch	LR	Delle	Education, colleges, higher education, culture and archives

== See also ==
- Territoire de Belfort
- Departmental councils of France
