= Marignac, Haute-Garonne =

Marignac
- Commune
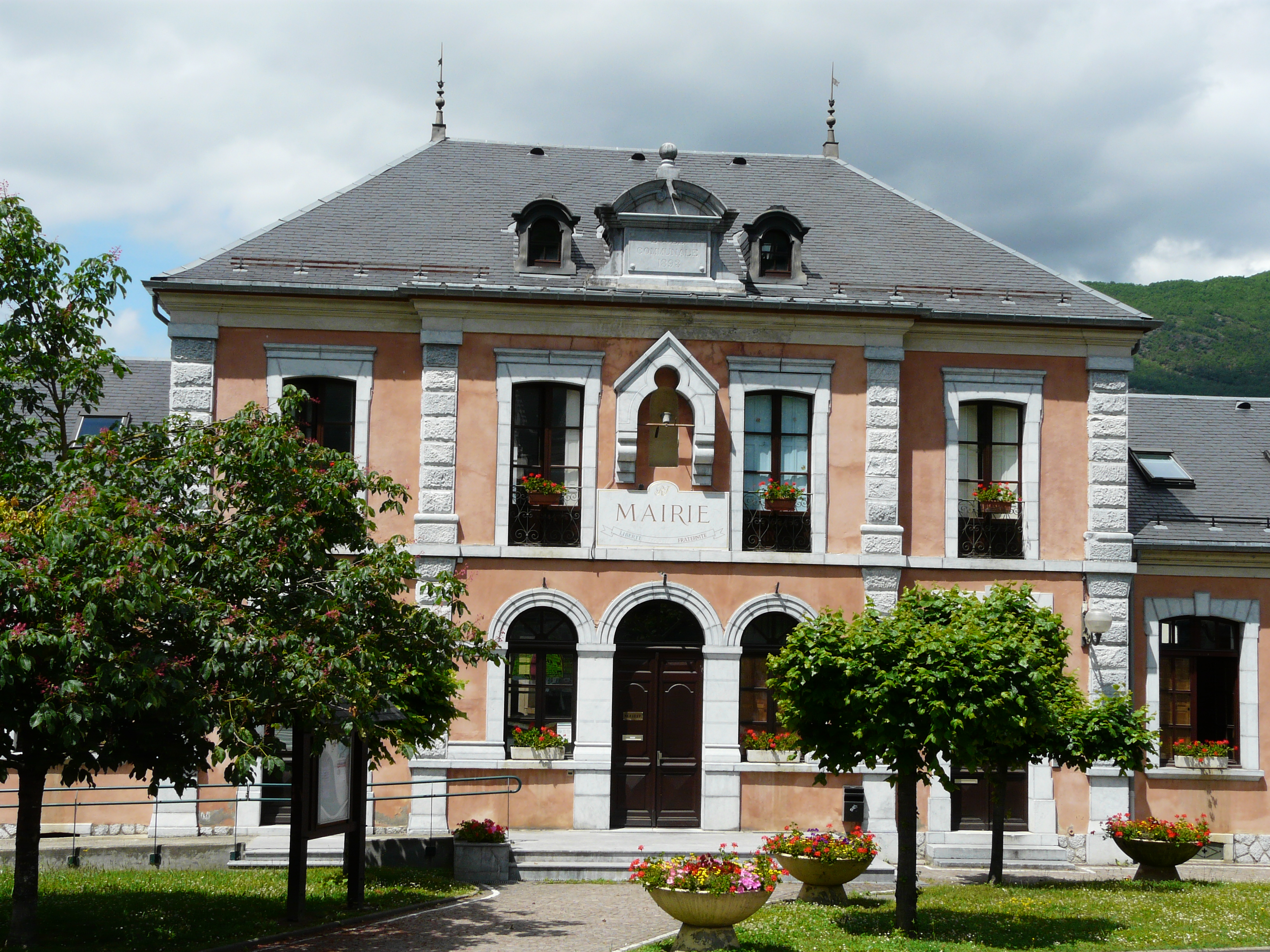
- Town hall

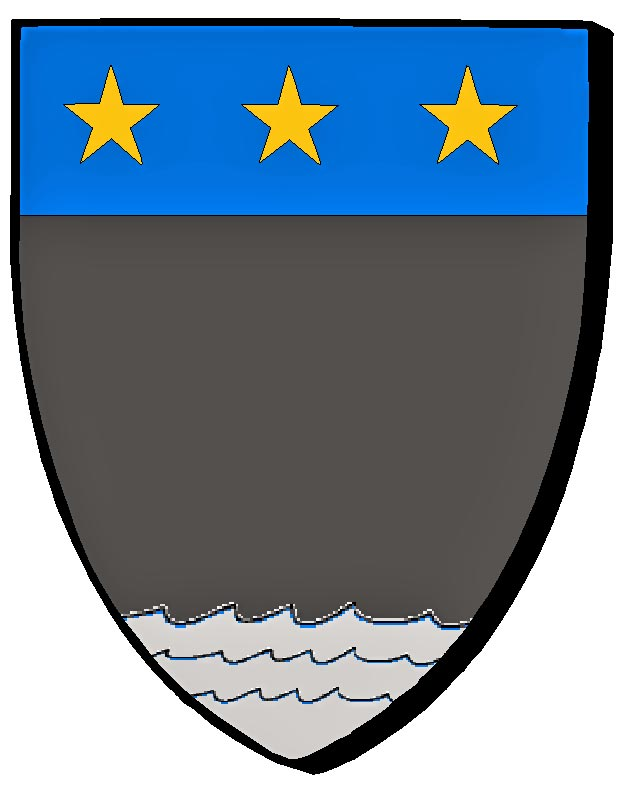
- Coat of arms
- Location of Marignac
- Location within France Location within Occitanie
- Coordinates: 42°54′54″N 0°39′33″E
- Country: France
- Region: Occitania
- Department: Haute-Garonne
- Arrondissement: Saint-Gaudens
- Canton: Bagnères-de-Luchon
- Intercommunality: Pyrénées Haut Garonnaises

Government
  - Mayor (2020–2026): André Campagne
- Area^{1}: 12.96 km^{2} (5.00 sq mi)
- Elevation: 510 m (1,670 ft)
- Highest elevation: 2,154 m (7,067 ft)
- Lowest elevation: 475 m (1,558 ft)
- Population (2023): 474
  - Density: 36.6/km^{2} (94.7/sq mi)
- Time zone: UTC+01:00 (CET)
  - Summer (DST): UTC+02:00 (CEST)
- INSEE/Postal code: 31316 /31440
- ^{1} French Land Register data, which excludes lakes, ponds, glaciers > 1 km^{2} (0.386 sq mi or 247 acres) and river estuaries.

Marignac (French pronunciation: [maʁiɲak]; Occitan: Marinhac) is a commune in the Haute-Garonne department in southwestern France.

== Population ==
Historical population
Year	Pop.	±% p.a.
1968	745	—
1975	685	−1.19%
1982	624	−1.32%
1990	537	−1.86%
1999	505	−0.68%
2007	518	+0.32%
2012	501	−0.67%
2017	484	−0.69%
2023	474	−0.35%
Source: INSEE

== See also ==
- Communes of the Haute-Garonne department
