= Michel Dreyfus-Schmidt =

French politician

Michel Dreyfus-Schmidt (June 17, 1932 - September 7, 2008) was a French politician who served in the National Assembly and the Senate as a member of the Parti socialiste.

== Biography ==
Dreyfus-Schmidt was born to a Jewish family from Alsace (his grand-uncle Moïse Schuhl was once Chief Rabbi of the region) who left Mulhouse for Belfort after Alsace was annexed by Germany in 1871. Dreyfus-Schmidt studied at Sciences Po before passing the bar and returning to practice law in Belfort in 1954. He began his political career in 1964 in Belfort as a member of the Union progressiste.

=== Local politics ===
Dreyfus-Schmidt served as a municipal councilor and assistant mayor from 1964 to 1971, as a general councilor from 1967 to 1979 in the Canton of Belfort-Ouest and as the vice-president of Departmental Council from 1976 to 1979.

=== National politics ===
He began his national political career in the 1967 French legislative election, when he was elected a member of the National Assembly for the Territoire de Belfort as a member of the Fédération de la gauche démocrate et socialiste (FGDS) but was defeated in the 1968 French legislative election by right-wing candidate André Tisserand.

Dreyfus-Schmidt was elected as a Senator in 1980 and was re-elected in 1989 and 1998. From 1986 to 1998, Dreyfus-Schmidt served as vice-president of the Senate.

Dreyfus-Schmidt served as a member of the steering committee and the national office of the Parti socialiste. Despite being an agnostic, Dreyfus-Schmidt served as president of the French branch of the World Jewish Congress from 1982 to 1986 and member of steering committee for the Conseil représentatif des institutions juives de France (CRIF).

Dreyfus-Schmidt died in 2008, three weeks before the end of his senatorial term. He had lost the PS nomination to Yves Ackermann.

He is buried in the Cimetière israélite de Belfort.
