= List of presidents of departmental councils (France) =

Current political majority in each departmental council: French Communist Party Socialist Party Miscellaneous left Radical Party of the Left Democratic Movement Union of Democrats and Independents The Republicans Miscellaneous right

In France, the President of the Departmental Council (French: Président du Conseil départemental) is the locally elected head of the departmental council, the assembly governing a department in France. The position is elected by the departmental councillors from among their number. If there is a tie, the councillor senior of age is elected.

As per Articles L1111-1 to L7331-3 of the General code of local and regional authorities, the responsibilities of the President of the Departmental Council include:

- Chairing the departmental authorities
- Preparing and implementing the council's decisions
- Collection of tax revenues
- Representing the department in legal cases

== History ==
In 1833, a law was enacted that gave each canton (subdivision of a department) representation of a councillor (Conseiller général).

As a result of the decentralisation of government (Deferre law), the election criteria were redefined in 1982 and the President of the Departmental Council took over executive powers from the centrally-appointed prefect.

=== Women presidents ===
Term	Name	Department	References
1970–1982	Évelyne Baylet	Tarn-et-Garonne	
1982–1985	Lucette Michaux-Chevry	Guadeloupe	
1985–1994	Janine Bardou	Lozère	
1991–2011	Anne d'Ornano	Calvados	
1998–2004	Marisol Touraine	Indre-et-Loire	
2004–2015	Marie-Françoise Pérol-Dumont	Haute-Vienne	
2004–2017	Nassimah Dindar	Réunion	
2008–2011	Claude Roiron	Indre-et-Loire	
2008–2011	Josette Durrieu	Hautes-Pyrénées	
2010–present	Hermeline Malherbe-Laurent	Pyrénées-Orientales	
2011–2015	Josette Manin	Martinique	
2014–present	Anne Hidalgo	Paris	

== List of the presidents of the departmental councils ==
#	Département (or collectivity)	President	Party	Since	Ref.
01	Ain	Jean Deguerry	The Republicans	2017	
02	Aisne	Nicolas Fricoteaux	Union of Democrats and Independents	2015	
03	Allier	Claude Riboulet	Union of Democrats and Independents	2017	
04	Alpes-de-Haute-Provence	Éliane Barreille	The Republicans	2021	
05	Hautes-Alpes	Jean-Marie Bernard	The Republicans	2015	
06	Alpes-Maritimes	Charles Ange Ginésy	The Republicans	2017	
07	Ardèche	Olivier Amrane	The Republicans	2021	
08	Ardennes	Noël Bourgeois	The Republicans	2017	
09	Ariège	Christine Téqui	Socialist Party	2021	
10	Aube	Philippe Pichery	Miscellaneous Right	2017	
11	Aude	Hélène Sandragné	Socialist Party	2021	
12	Aveyron	Arnaud Viala	The Republicans	2017	
13	Bouches-du-Rhône	Martine Vassal	The Republicans	2015	
14	Calvados	Jean-Léonce Dupont	Union of Democrats and Independents	2011	
15	Cantal	Bruno Faure	The Republicans	2017	
16	Charente	Philippe Bouty	Miscellaneous Right	2015	
17	Charente-Maritime	Sylvie Marcilly	Miscellaneous Right	2021	
18	Cher	Jacques Fleury	The Republicans	2021	
19	Corrèze	Pascal Coste	The Republicans	2015	
21	Côte-d'Or	François Sauvadet	Union of Democrats and Independents	2008	
22	Côtes-d'Armor	Christian Coail	The Republicans	2015	
23	Creuse	Valérie Simonet	The Republicans	2015	
24	Dordogne	Germinal Peiro	Socialist Party	2015	
25	Doubs	Christine Bouquin	Miscellaneous Right	2015	
26	Drôme	Marie-Pierre Mouton	The Republicans	2017	
27	Eure	Alexandre Rassaërt	Miscellaneous right	2022	
28	Eure-et-Loir	Christophe Le Dorven	The Republicans	2021	
29	Finistère	Maël de Calan	Union of the Centre and Right	2021	
30	Gard	Françoise Laurent-Perrigot	Socialist Party	2021	
31	Haute-Garonne	Sébastien Vincini	Socialist Party	2022	
32	Gers	Philippe Dupouy	Socialist Party	2022	
33	Gironde	Jean-Luc Gleyze	Socialist Party	2015	
34	Hérault	Kléber Mesquida	Socialist Party	2015	
35	Ille-et-Vilaine	Jean-Luc Chenut	Socialist Party	2015	
36	Indre	Marc Fleuret	The Republicans	2021	
37	Indre-et-Loire	Jean-Gérard Paumier	Union of the Centre and Right	2016	
38	Isère	Jean-Pierre Barbier	The Republicans	2015	
39	Jura	Clément Pernot	Miscellaneous Right	2015	
40	Landes	Xavier Fortinon	Socialist Party	2017	
41	Loir-et-Cher	Philippe Gouet	Union of Democrats and Independents	2021	
42	Loire	George Ziegler	The Republicans	2021	
43	Haute-Loire	Marie-Agnès Petit	The Republicans	2014	
44	Loire-Atlantique	Michel Ménard	Socialist Party	2021	
45	Loiret	Marc Gaudet	Miscellaneous right	2017	
46	Lot	Serge Rigal	Miscellaneous left	2014	
47	Lot-et-Garonne	Sophie Borderie	Socialist Party	2015	
48	Lozère	Sophie Pantel	Socialist Party	2015	
49	Maine-et-Loire	Florence Dabin	Miscellaneous Right	2021	
50	Manche	Jean Morin	Miscellaneous Right	2021	
51	Marne	Christian Bruyen	Miscellaneous Right	2017	
52	Haute-Marne	Nicolas Lacroix	The Republicans	2017	
53	Mayenne	Olivier Richefou	Centrist Alliance	2014	
54	Meurthe-et-Moselle	Chaynesse Khirouni	Socialist Party	2021	
55	Meuse	Jérôme Dumont	Miscellaneous Right	2021	
56	Morbihan	David Lappartient	Union of the Centre and Right	2021	
57	Moselle	Patrick Weiten	Miscellaneous Right	2011	
58	Nièvre	Fabien Bazin	Socialist Party	2021	
59	Nord	Christian Poiret	Socialist Party	2015	
60	Oise	Nadège Lefebvre	The Republicans	2017	
61	Orne	Christophe de Balorre	The Republicans	2017	
62	Pas-de-Calais	Jean-Claude Leroy	Socialist Party	2015	
63	Puy-de-Dôme	Lionel Chauvin	The Republicans	2021	
64	Pyrénées-Atlantiques	Jean-Jacques Lasserre	Democratic Movement	2015	
65	Hautes-Pyrénées	Michel Pélieu	Radical Party of the Left	2011	
66	Pyrénées-Orientales	Hermeline Malherbe-Laurent	Miscellaneous Left	2010	
69	Rhône	Christophe Guilloteau	The Republicans	2015	
69M	Lyon	Bruno Bernard	Europe Ecology - The Greens	2020	
70	Haute-Saône	Yves Krattinger	Socialist Party	2001	
71	Saône-et-Loire	André Accary	The Republicans	2015	
72	Sarthe	Dominique Le Mèner	The Republicans	2015	
73	Savoie	Hervé Gaymard	The Republicans	2008	
74	Haute-Savoie	Martial Saddier	The Republicans	2021	
75	Paris	Anne Hidalgo	Socialist Party	2014	
76	Seine-Maritime	Bertrand Bellanger	Renaissance	2021	
77	Seine-et-Marne	Jean-François Parigi	The Republicans	2021	
78	Yvelines	Pierre Bédier	The Republicans	2014	
79	Deux-Sèvres	Coralie Dénoues	Miscellaneous Right	2021	
80	Somme	Stéphane Haussoulier	Miscellaneous Right	2020	
81	Tarn	Christophe Ramond	Socialist Party	2015	
82	Tarn-et-Garonne	Michel Weill	Socialist Party	2021	
83	Var	Marc Giraud	The Republicans	2015	
84	Vaucluse	Dominique Santoni	The Republicans	2021	
85	Vendée	Alain Leboeuf	The Republicans	2021	
86	Vienne	Alain Pichon	Miscellaneous Right	2021	
87	Haute-Vienne	Jean-Claude Leblois	Socialist Party	2015	
88	Vosges	François Vannson	The Republicans	2015	
89	Yonne	Patrick Gendraud	The Republicans	2017	
90	Territoire de Belfort	Florian Bouquet	The Republicans	2015	
91	Essonne	François Durovray	The Republicans	2015	
92	Hauts-de-Seine	Georges Siffredi	The Republicans	2021	
93	Seine-Saint-Denis	Stéphane Troussel	Socialist Party	2012	
94	Val-de-Marne	Olivier Capitanio	The Republicans	2021	
95	Val-d’Oise	Marie-Christine Cavecchi	The Republicans	2017	
971	Guadeloupe	Guy Losbar	United Guadeloupe, Socialism and Realities	2021	
972	Martinique	Serge Letchimy	Martinican Progressive Party	2021	
973	Guyane	Alain Tien-Liong	Decolonization and Social Emancipation Movement	2008	
974	Réunion	Cyrille Melchior	Miscellaneous Left	2017	
975	Saint-Pierre-et-Miquelon (overseas collectivity)	Bernard Briand	Archipelago Tomorrow	2021	
976	Mayotte	Ben Issa Ousseni	The Republicans	2021	

== Allowance ==
The president of a department council has a maximum allowance of €5,441 per month, the vice-presidents has a maximum allowance of €128.83-725.44, members of the standing committee have maximum allowances of €672.65-927.13, and departmental advisors have maximum allowances of €1,501-2,626 per month.
