= Troubat =

- Commune
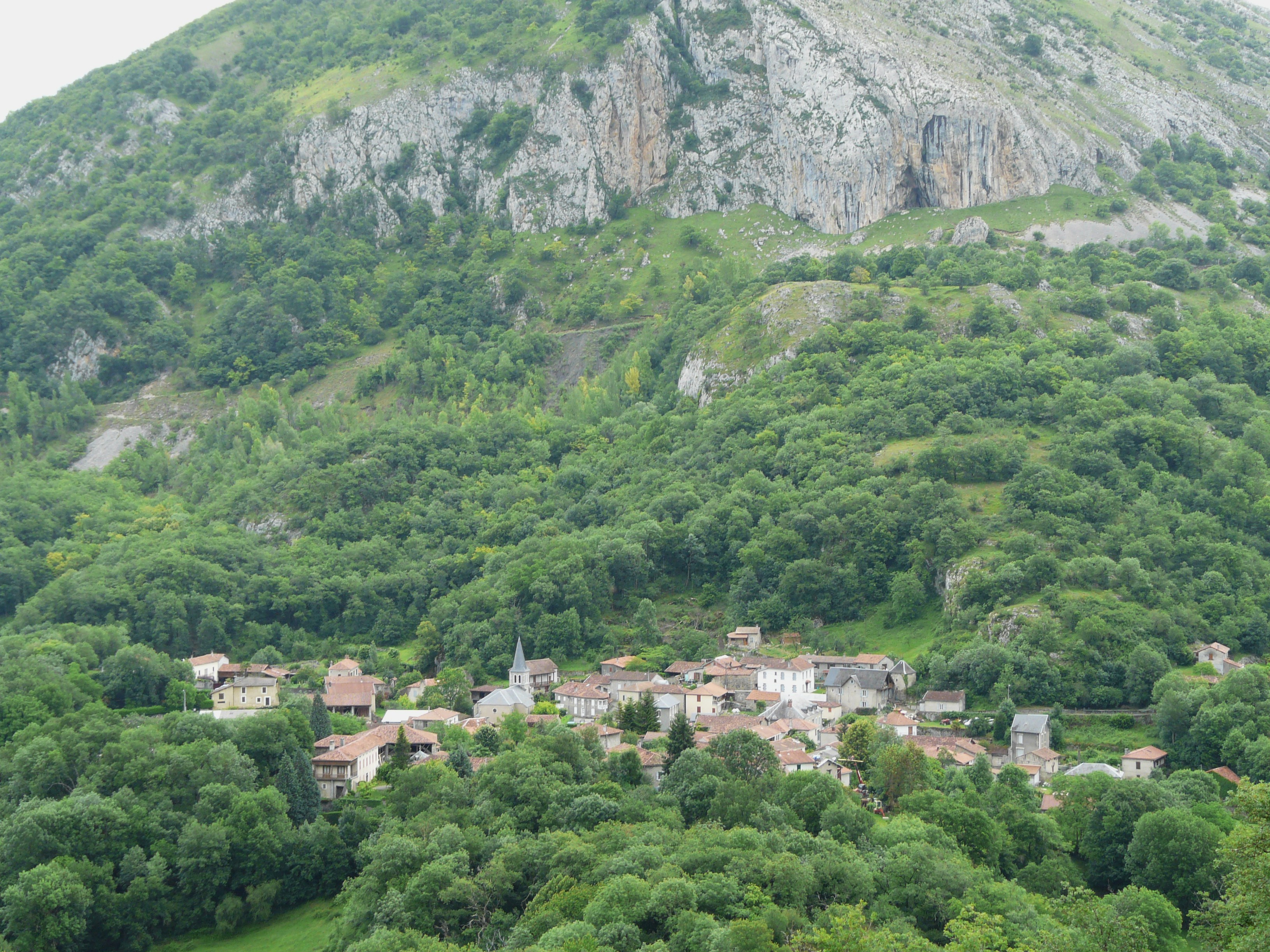
- The village of Troubat

- Coat of arms
- Location of Troubat
- Location within France Location within Occitanie
- Coordinates: 42°58′37″N 0°34′52″E
- Country: France
- Region: Occitania
- Department: Hautes-Pyrénées
- Arrondissement: Bagnères-de-Bigorre
- Canton: La Vallée de la Barousse
- Intercommunality: Neste Barousse

Government
  - Mayor (2020–2026): Alain Porte
- Area^{1}: 2.79 km^{2} (1.08 sq mi)
- Elevation: 520 m (1,710 ft)
- Highest elevation: 1,052 m (3,451 ft)
- Lowest elevation: 519 m (1,703 ft)
- Population (2023): 75
  - Density: 27/km^{2} (70/sq mi)
- Time zone: UTC+01:00 (CET)
  - Summer (DST): UTC+02:00 (CEST)
- INSEE/Postal code: 65453 /65370
- ^{1} French Land Register data, which excludes lakes, ponds, glaciers > 1 km^{2} (0.386 sq mi or 247 acres) and river estuaries.

Troubat is a commune in the Hautes-Pyrénées department in south-western France.

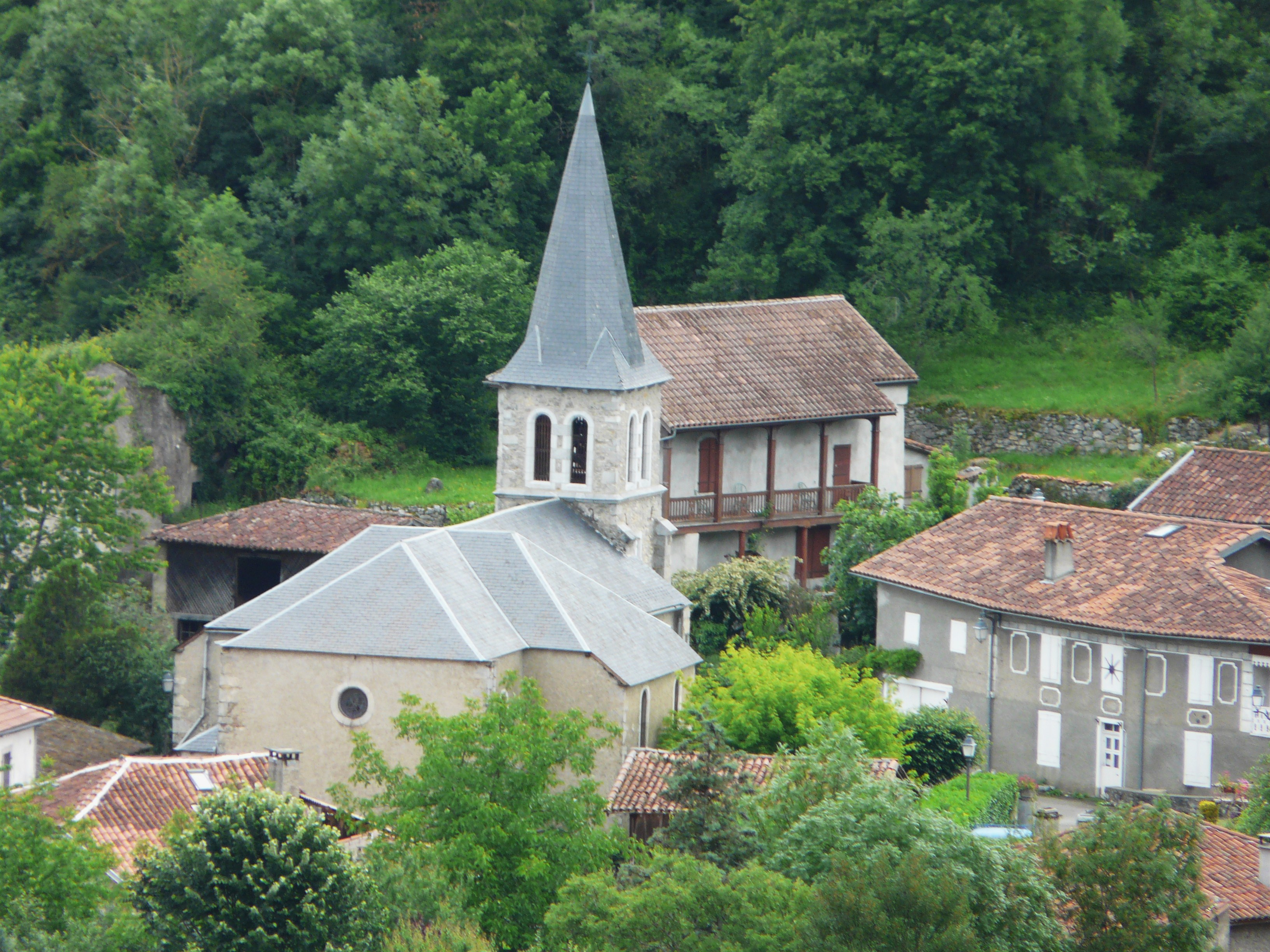
Church Saint-Pierre

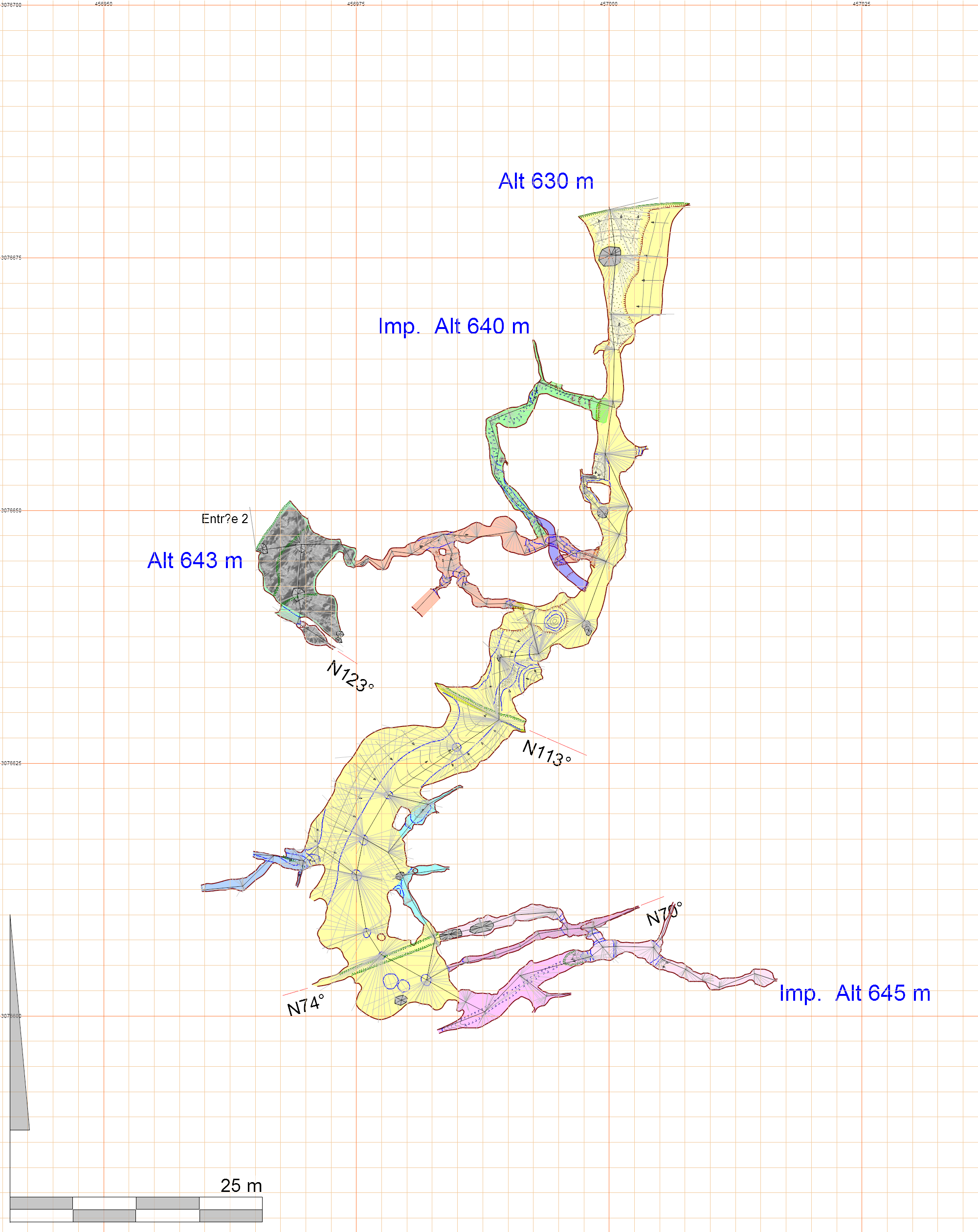
Map of Sainte Araille Cave

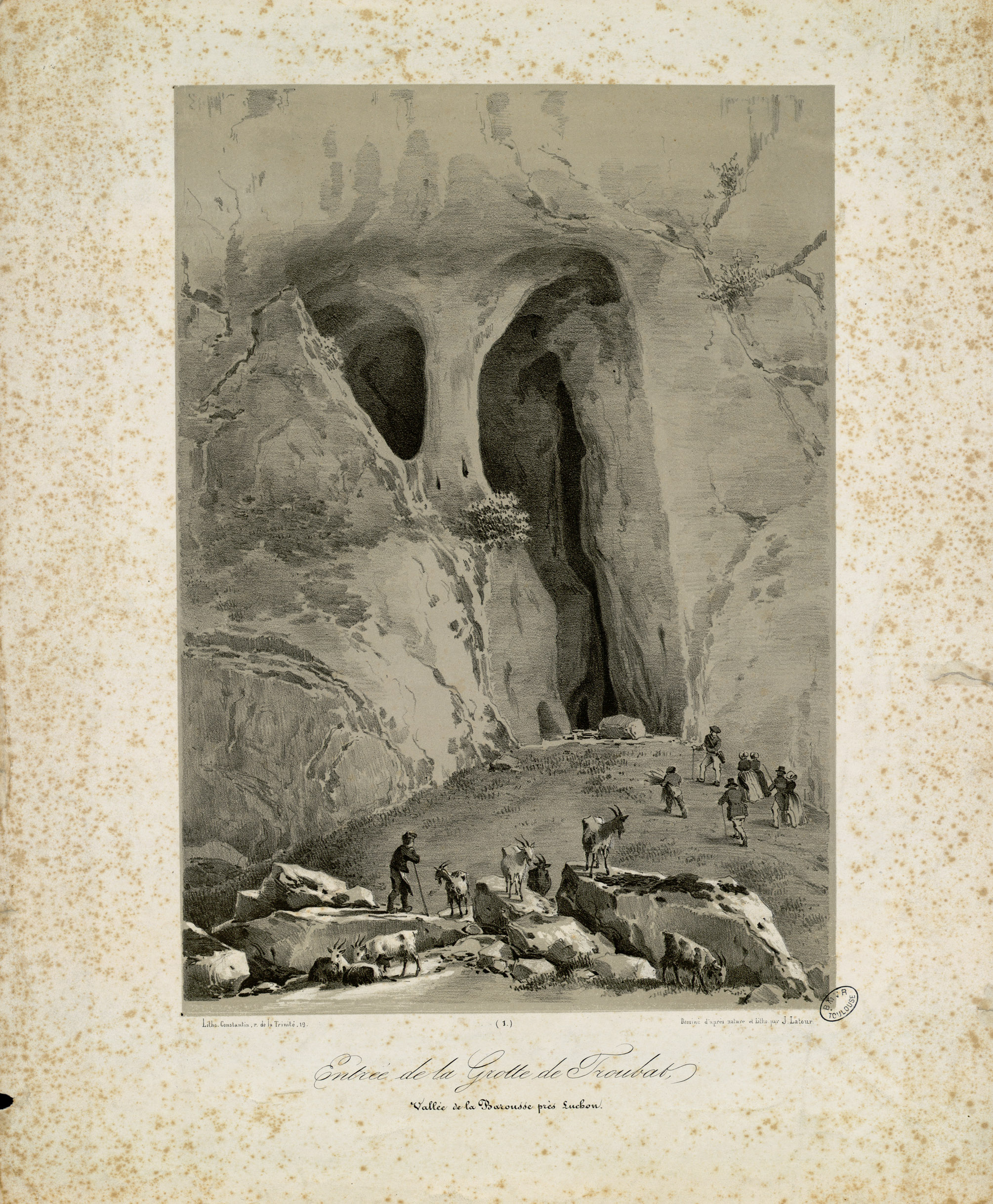
Entrance to the Cave of Troubat - Valley of the Barousse, by Joseph Latour

== See also ==
- Communes of the Hautes-Pyrénées department
- Barousse valley
