= Antichan =

- Commune
- Coat of arms
- Location of Antichan
- Location within France Location within Occitanie
- Coordinates: 42°59′44″N 0°34′59″E
- Country: France
- Region: Occitania
- Department: Hautes-Pyrénées
- Arrondissement: Bagnères-de-Bigorre
- Canton: La Vallée de la Barousse

Government
  - Mayor (2020–2026): Jean-Yves Arne
- Area^{1}: 1.19 km^{2} (0.46 sq mi)
- Elevation: 633 m (2,077 ft)
- Highest elevation: 648 m (2,126 ft)
- Lowest elevation: 493 m (1,617 ft)
- Population (2023): 41
  - Density: 34/km^{2} (89/sq mi)
- Time zone: UTC+01:00 (CET)
  - Summer (DST): UTC+02:00 (CEST)
- INSEE/Postal code: 65014 /65370
- ^{1} French Land Register data, which excludes lakes, ponds, glaciers > 1 km^{2} (0.386 sq mi or 247 acres) and river estuaries.

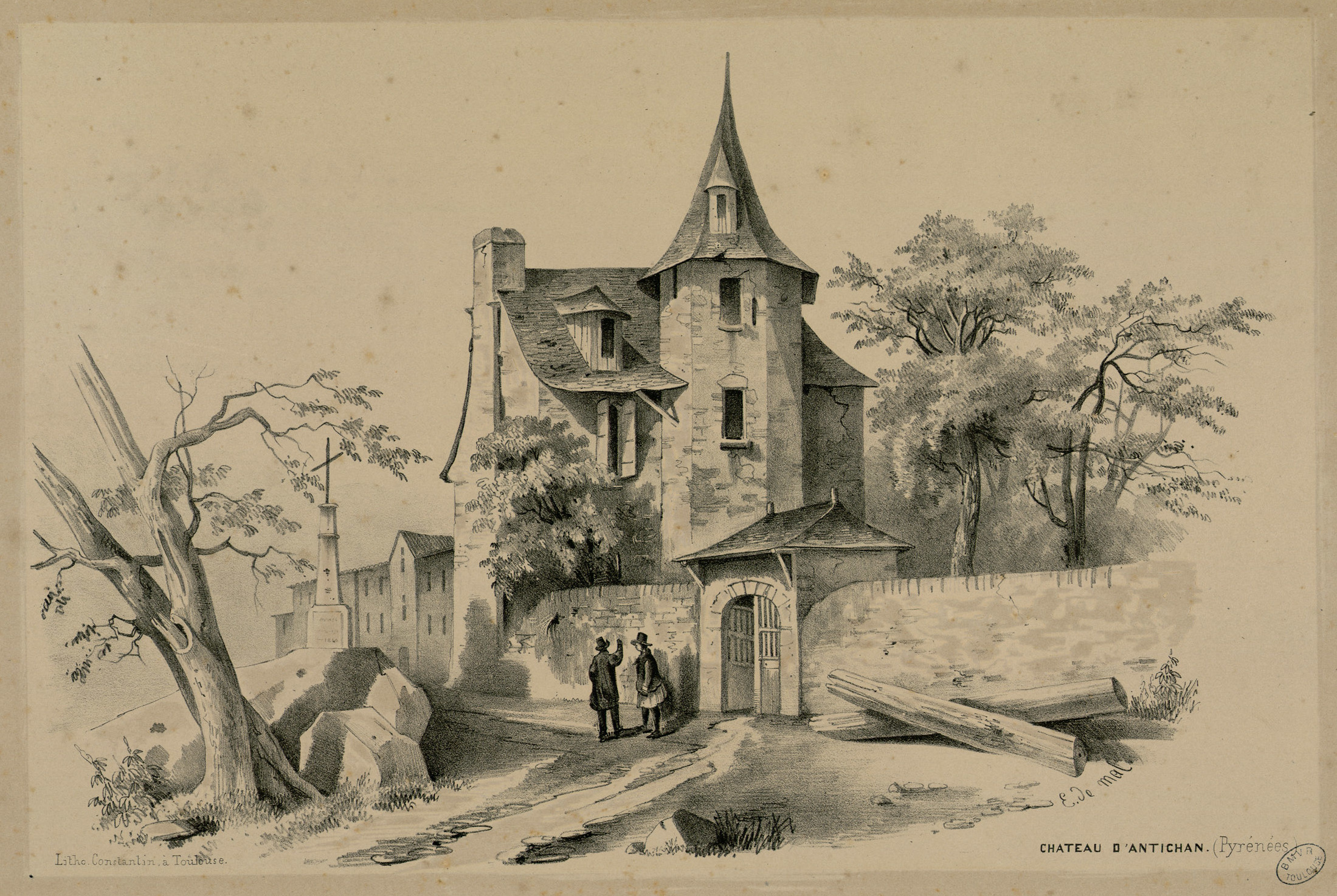
Château d'Antichan (Pyrénées) - Fonds Ancely

Antichan (French pronunciation: [ɑ̃tiʃɑ̃]; Occitan: Antishan) is a commune in the Hautes-Pyrénées department in southwestern France.

== Population ==
Historical population
Year	Pop.	±% p.a.
1968	50	—
1975	41	−2.80%
1982	31	−3.92%
1990	21	−4.75%
1999	27	+2.83%
2007	30	+1.33%
2012	37	+4.28%
2017	35	−1.11%
2023	41	+2.67%
Source: INSEE

== See also ==
- Communes of the Hautes-Pyrénées department
- Barousse valley
