= Sarp =

- Commune
- Coat of arms
- Location of Sarp
- Location within France Location within Occitanie
- Coordinates: 43°00′58″N 0°35′24″E
- Country: France
- Region: Occitania
- Department: Hautes-Pyrénées
- Arrondissement: Bagnères-de-Bigorre
- Canton: La Vallée de la Barousse
- Intercommunality: Neste Barousse

Government
  - Mayor (2020–2026): Robert Foraste (PRG)
- Area^{1}: 1.82 km^{2} (0.70 sq mi)
- Elevation: 472 m (1,549 ft)
- Highest elevation: 742 m (2,434 ft)
- Lowest elevation: 467 m (1,532 ft)
- Population (2023): 106
  - Density: 58.2/km^{2} (151/sq mi)
- Time zone: UTC+01:00 (CET)
  - Summer (DST): UTC+02:00 (CEST)
- INSEE/Postal code: 65407 /65370
- ^{1} French Land Register data, which excludes lakes, ponds, glaciers > 1 km^{2} (0.386 sq mi or 247 acres) and river estuaries.

Sarp is a commune in the Hautes-Pyrénées department in south-western France.

== See also ==
- Communes of the Hautes-Pyrénées department
- Barousse valley
