= Bramevaque =

- Commune
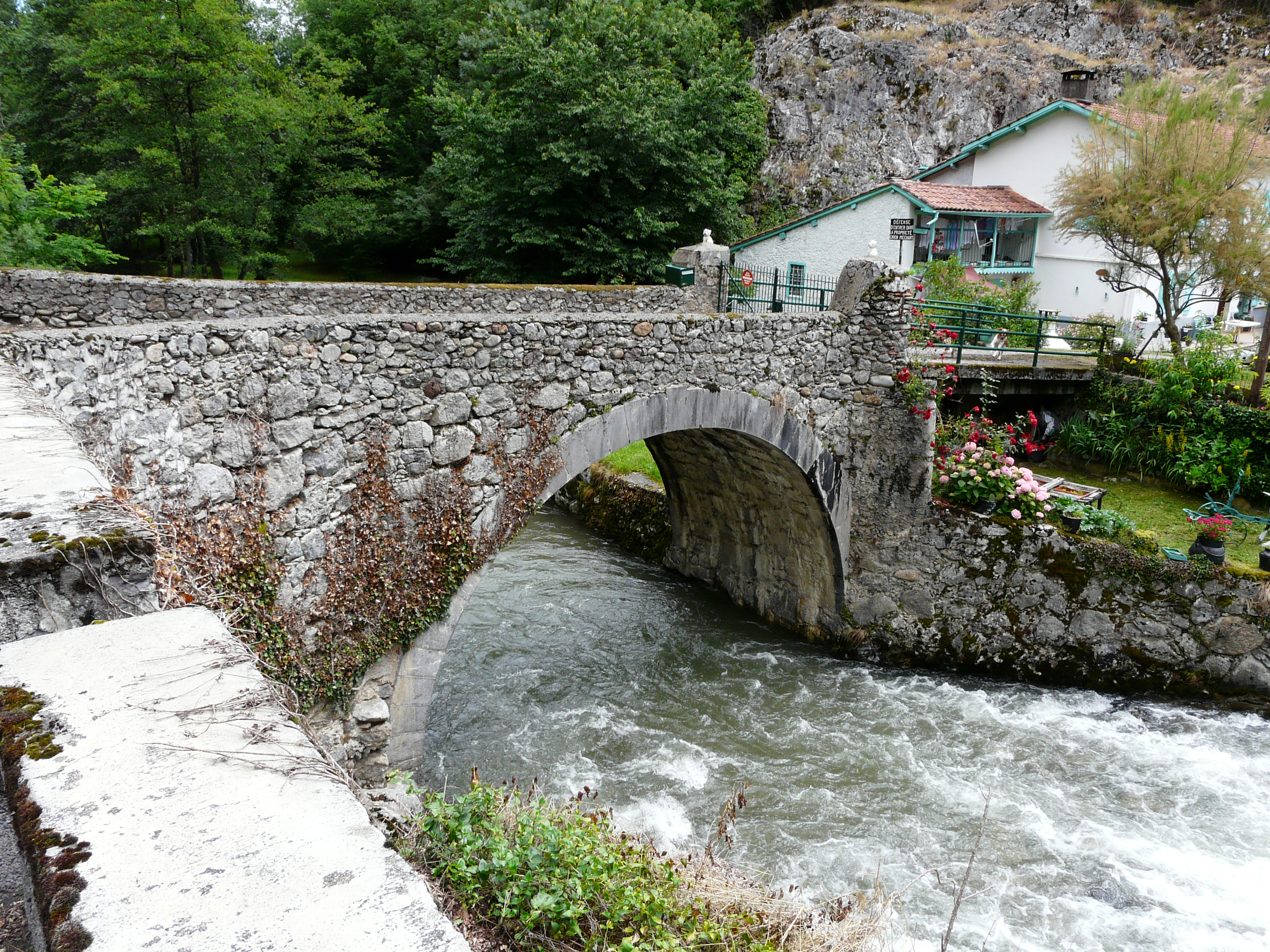
- Bridge over the Ourse

- Coat of arms
- Location of Bramevaque
- Location within France Location within Occitanie
- Coordinates: 42°58′42″N 0°34′32″E
- Country: France
- Region: Occitania
- Department: Hautes-Pyrénées
- Arrondissement: Bagnères-de-Bigorre
- Canton: La Vallée de la Barousse

Government
  - Mayor (2020–2026): Joëlle Fortassin
- Area^{1}: 3.77 km^{2} (1.46 sq mi)
- Elevation: 559 m (1,834 ft)
- Highest elevation: 1,543 m (5,062 ft)
- Lowest elevation: 517 m (1,696 ft)
- Population (2023): 31
  - Density: 8.2/km^{2} (21/sq mi)
- Time zone: UTC+01:00 (CET)
  - Summer (DST): UTC+02:00 (CEST)
- INSEE/Postal code: 65109 /65370
- ^{1} French Land Register data, which excludes lakes, ponds, glaciers > 1 km^{2} (0.386 sq mi or 247 acres) and river estuaries.

Bramevaque (French pronunciation: [bʁamvak]; Occitan: Brauvaca) is a commune in the Hautes-Pyrénées department in southwestern France.

== Population ==
Historical population
Year	Pop.	±% p.a.
1968	36	—
1975	23	−6.20%
1982	31	+4.36%
1990	23	−3.66%
1999	23	+0.00%
2007	33	+4.62%
2012	37	+2.31%
2017	34	−1.68%
2023	31	−1.53%
Source: INSEE

== See also ==
- Communes of the Hautes-Pyrénées department
- Barousse valley
