= François Abadie =

French politician

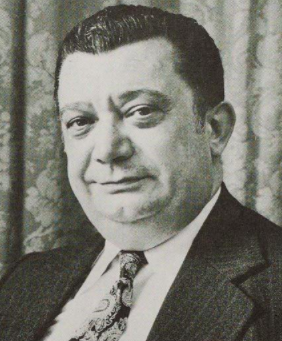
François Abadie,1981

François Abadie (19 June 1930, in Lourdes, Hautes-Pyrénées – 2 March 2001, in Paris) was a French politician. A former mayor of Lourdes, Abadie represented the Hautes-Pyrénées region in the French senate.

== National mandates ==
- Deputy for Hautes-Pyrénées (representing Radical Party of the Left) 1973–1981
- Senator for Hautes-Pyrénées 1983–2001
- Mayor of Lourdes 1971–1989

== Ministerial functions ==
- Minister of Tourism 22 May 1981 – 24 March 1983

== Parliamentary function ==
- Member of the Department of Cultural Affairs
