= Michel Pélieu =

French politician

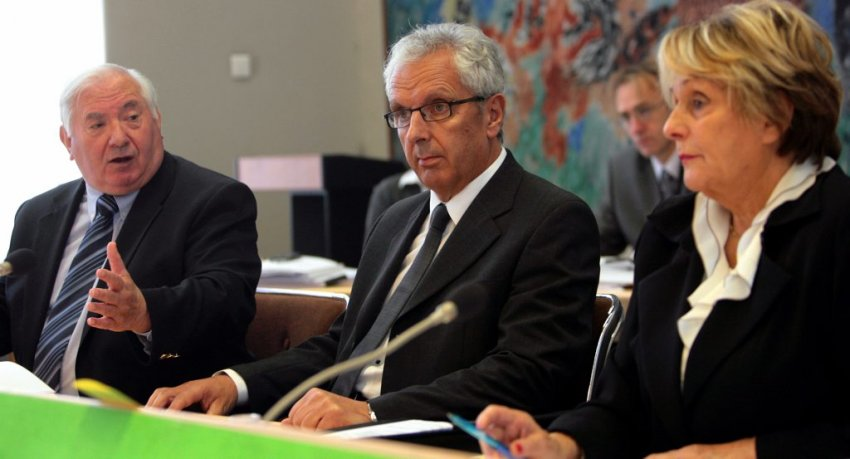
Michel Pélieu (center) in 2011, with François Fortassin (left) and Josette Durrieu (right)

Michel Pélieu (born 26 June 1946) is a French politician.

== Biography ==
A member of the Radical Left Party (PRG), Pélieu was elected mayor of Loudenvielle from 1977 to 2011. In 1985, he became general counsel of the canton of Bordères-Louron, in Hautes-Pyrénées.

Since the French senate elections in 2001, he has been the deputy of François Fortassin.

During the local elections of 2011, he was elected with 70% of votes in the canton of Bordères-Louron and ran for the presidency of the General Council, facing past president Josette Durrieu. After a tight turn, Pélieu became chairman of the Departmental Council of Hautes-Pyrénées.

At the departmental elections of 2015, partnering with Maryse Beyrié (PS), they earned 75.13% of the vote in the canton of Neste, Aure, and Louron. Pélieu was re-elected head of the department 31–3.

== Distinctions ==
- Legion of Honour in April 2014
