= Josette Durrieu =

French politician (born 1937)

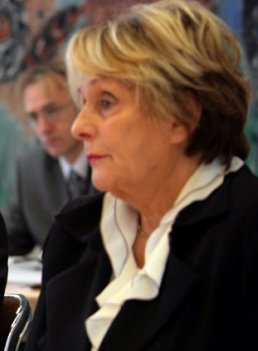
Image of Josette Durrieu

Josette Durrieu (born 20 March 1937) is a French politician and a member of the Senate of France. She represents the Hautes-Pyrénées department and is a member of the Socialist Party.

In the Senate, Durrieu serves as vice-chairwoman of the Commission on Foreign Affairs, Defence and Armed Forces. In addition to her committee assignments, she is a member of the French-Moldavian Parliamentary Friendship Group. She is also a member of the Cour de Justice de la République.

In addition to her work in the Senate, Durrieu served as member of the French delegation to the Parliamentary Assembly of the Council of Europe from 1992 until 2017. In this capacity, she was a member of the Committee on Political Affairs and Democracy; the Committee on the Honouring of Obligations and Commitments by Member States of the Council of Europe (Monitoring Committee); the Sub-Committee on relations with the Organisation for Economic Co-operation and Development (OECD) and the European Bank for Reconstruction and Development (EBRD); the Sub-Committee on the Middle East and the Arab World; and the Sub-Committee on the Rights of Minorities. She is also the Assembly's rapporteur on Turkey. She was part of an 11-member delegation to observe the conduct of the 2016 parliamentary elections in Morocco.

== Other mandates ==
- Municipal councillor of Saint-Laurent-de-Neste
- Cantonal councillor of the canton of Saint-Laurent-de-Neste
- Vice president of the French delegation of the Parliamentary Assembly of the Western European Union
- President of the association of friendship France-Moldova
- Member of the Cour de Justice de la République
