= Hundred Days =

1815 period of the Napoleonic Wars

War of the Seventh Coalition
- Part of the Napoleonic Wars and the Coalition Wars
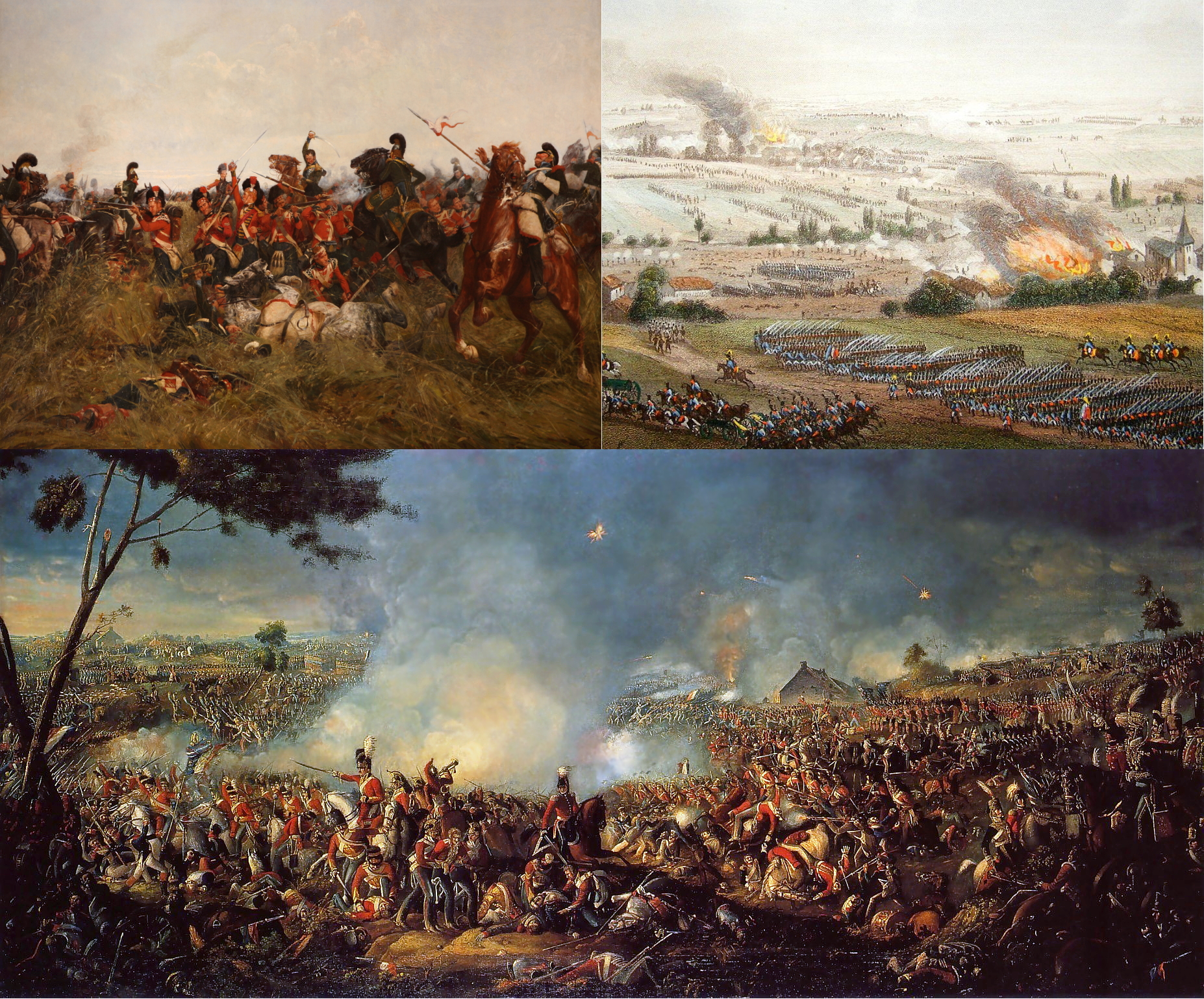
- hundred days Click an image to load the battle. Left to right, top to bottom: Battles of Quatre Bras, Ligny, Waterloo.
Date	20 March – 8 July 1815 (Note: Histories differ over the start and end dates of the Hundred Days; another popular period is from 1 March, when Napoleon I landed in France, to his defeat at Waterloo on 18 June. Winkler Prins (2002) counted 100 days from Napoleon's entry in Paris on 20 March to the Cambray Proclamation of 28 June 1815.) (110 days)
Location	France; Netherlands
Result	Coalition victory: Second Treaty of Paris; End of the Napoleonic Wars; Second exile of Napoleon (to the island of Saint Helena) and second Bourbon Restoration; Beginning of the Concert of Europe

Belligerents
United Kingdom; Prussia; Austria; Netherlands; Hanover; Kingdom of France; Brunswick; Württemberg; Nassau; Tuscany; Russia; Sardinia; Switzerland	France; Naples; (until May 20th)

Commanders and leaders
(United Kingdom of Great Britain and Ireland) Prince Regent George; (United Kingdom of Great Britain and Ireland) Robert Jenkinson; (United Kingdom of Great Britain and Ireland) Arthur Wellesley; (United Kingdom of Great Britain and Ireland) Hudson Lowe; (Kingdom of Prussia) Frederick William III; (Kingdom of Prussia) Gebhard Leberecht von Blücher; (Austrian Empire) Archduke Charles; (Austrian Empire) Karl von Schwarzenberg; (Austrian Empire) Frederick Bianchi; (Austrian Empire) Johann Frimont; (United Kingdom of the Netherlands) William I; (United Kingdom of the Netherlands) William, Prince of Orange; (Bourbon Restoration in France) Louis XVIII; (Bourbon Restoration in France) Charles Autichamp; (Russian Empire) Alexander I; (Russian Empire) Michael de Tolly	(First French Empire) Napoleon I (surrendered) (until 22nd June); (First French Empire) Louis-Nicolas Davout; (First French Empire) Michel Ney (executed); (First French Empire) Emmanuel de Grouchy; (First French Empire) Louis-Gabriel Suchet; (First French Empire) Jean-de-Dieu Soult; (First French Empire) Guillaume Brune; (First French Empire) Jean Rapp; (First French Empire) Bertrand Clauzel; (First French Empire) Charles Decaen; (First French Empire) Jean Maximilien Lamarque; (First French Empire) Claude Lecourbe; (Kingdom of Naples) Joachim Murat (executed) (until May 20th)

Units involved
- Hundred Days order of battle

Strength
800,000–1,000,000	280,000

Casualties and losses
Unknown number of casualties	(First French Empire) c. 40,000 total military dead; 14,700 killed; 39,500 wounded (including died of wounds); (Kingdom of Naples) c. 20,000 killed, wounded, or captured
- See military mobilisation during the Hundred Days

The Hundred Days, commonly referred to as The War of The Seventh Coalition or Napoleon’s Hundred days (French: les Cent-Jours IPA: [le sɑ̃ ʒuʁ]) marked the period between Napoleon's return from ten months of exile on the island of Elba to Paris on 20 March 1815 and the second restoration of King Louis XVIII on 8 July 1815 (a period of 110 days). This period saw the War of the Seventh Coalition (French: Guerre de la Septième Coalition), a commonly-used name for the Hundred Days, which includes the Waterloo campaign and the Neapolitan War (Naples and Austria) as well as several other minor campaigns. The phrase les Cent Jours (the Hundred Days) was first used by the prefect of Paris, Gaspard, count of Chabrol, in his speech welcoming the king back to Paris on 8 July. (Note: Louis XVIII fled Paris on 19 March. When he entered Paris on 8 July, Count Chabrol, prefect of the department of the Seine, accompanied by the municipal body, addressed Louis XVIII in the name of his companions, in a speech that began "Sire,—One hundred days have passed away since your majesty, forced to tear yourself from your dearest affections, left your capital amidst tears and public consternation.")

Napoleon returned while the Congress of Vienna was sitting. On 13 March, seven days before Napoleon reached Paris, the powers at the Congress of Vienna declared him an outlaw, and on 25 March, Austria, Prussia, Russia, and the United Kingdom, the four Great Powers and key members of the Seventh Coalition, bound themselves to put 150,000 men each into the field to end his rule. This set the stage for the last conflict of the Napoleonic Wars, the defeat of Napoleon at the Battle of Waterloo, the second restoration of the French kingdom, and the permanent exile of Napoleon to the distant island of Saint Helena, where he died in 1821.

== Background ==
=== Napoleon's rise and fall ===
The French Revolutionary and Napoleonic Wars pitted France against various coalitions of other European nations nearly continuously from 1792 onward. The overthrow and subsequent public execution of Louis XVI in France had greatly disturbed other European leaders, who vowed to crush the French Republic. Rather than leading to France's defeat, the wars allowed the revolutionary regime to expand beyond its borders and create client republics. The success of the French forces made a hero out of their best commander, Napoleon Bonaparte. In 1799, Napoleon staged a successful coup d'état and became First Consul of the new French Consulate. Five years later, he crowned himself Emperor Napoleon I.

The rise of Napoleon troubled the other European powers as much as the earlier revolutionary regime had. Despite the formation of new coalitions against him, Napoleon's forces continued to conquer much of Europe. The tide of war began to turn after a disastrous French invasion of Russia in 1812 that resulted in the loss of much of Napoleon's army. The following year, during the War of the Sixth Coalition, Coalition forces defeated the French in the Battle of Leipzig.

Following its victory at Leipzig, the Coalition vowed to press on to Paris and depose Napoleon. In the last week of February 1814, Prussian Field Marshal Gebhard Leberecht von Blücher advanced on Paris. After multiple attacks, manoeuvring, and reinforcements on both sides, Blücher won the Battle of Laon in early March 1814; this victory prevented the Coalition army from being pushed north out of France. The Battle of Reims went to Napoleon, but this victory was followed by successive defeats in the 1814 campaign in France, with the French facing increasingly overwhelming odds. Coalition forces entered Paris after the Battle of Montmartre on 30 March 1814.

On 6 April 1814, Napoleon abdicated his throne, leading to the accession of Louis XVIII and the first Bourbon Restoration a month later. The defeated Napoleon was exiled to the island of Elba off the coast of Tuscany, while the victorious Coalition sought to redraw the map of Europe at the Congress of Vienna.

=== Exile in Elba ===
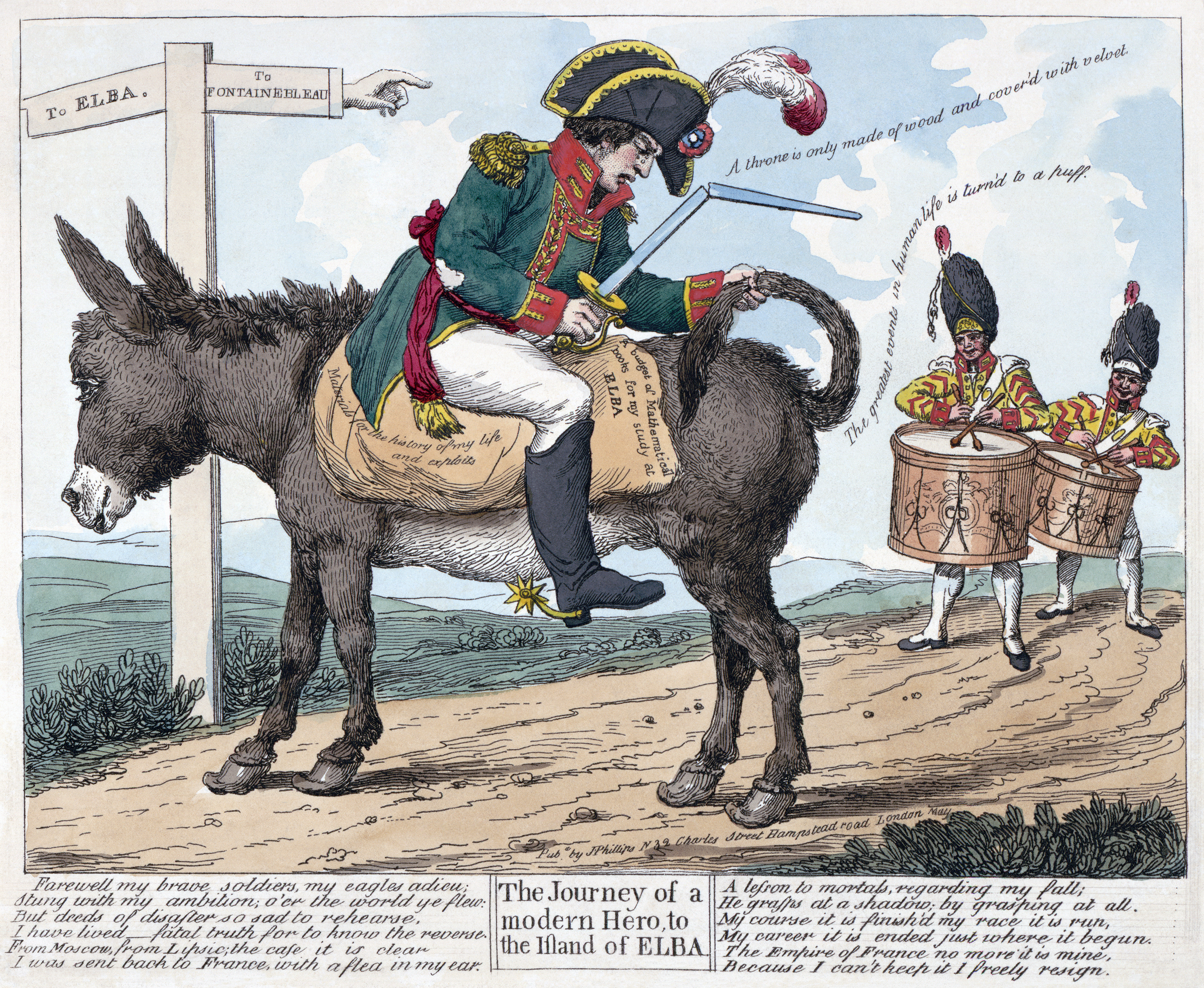
The journey of a modern hero, to the island of Elba. Print shows Napoleon seated backwards on a donkey on the road "to Elba" from Fontainebleau; he holds a broken sword in one hand and the donkey's tail in the other while two drummers follow him playing a farewell(?) march.

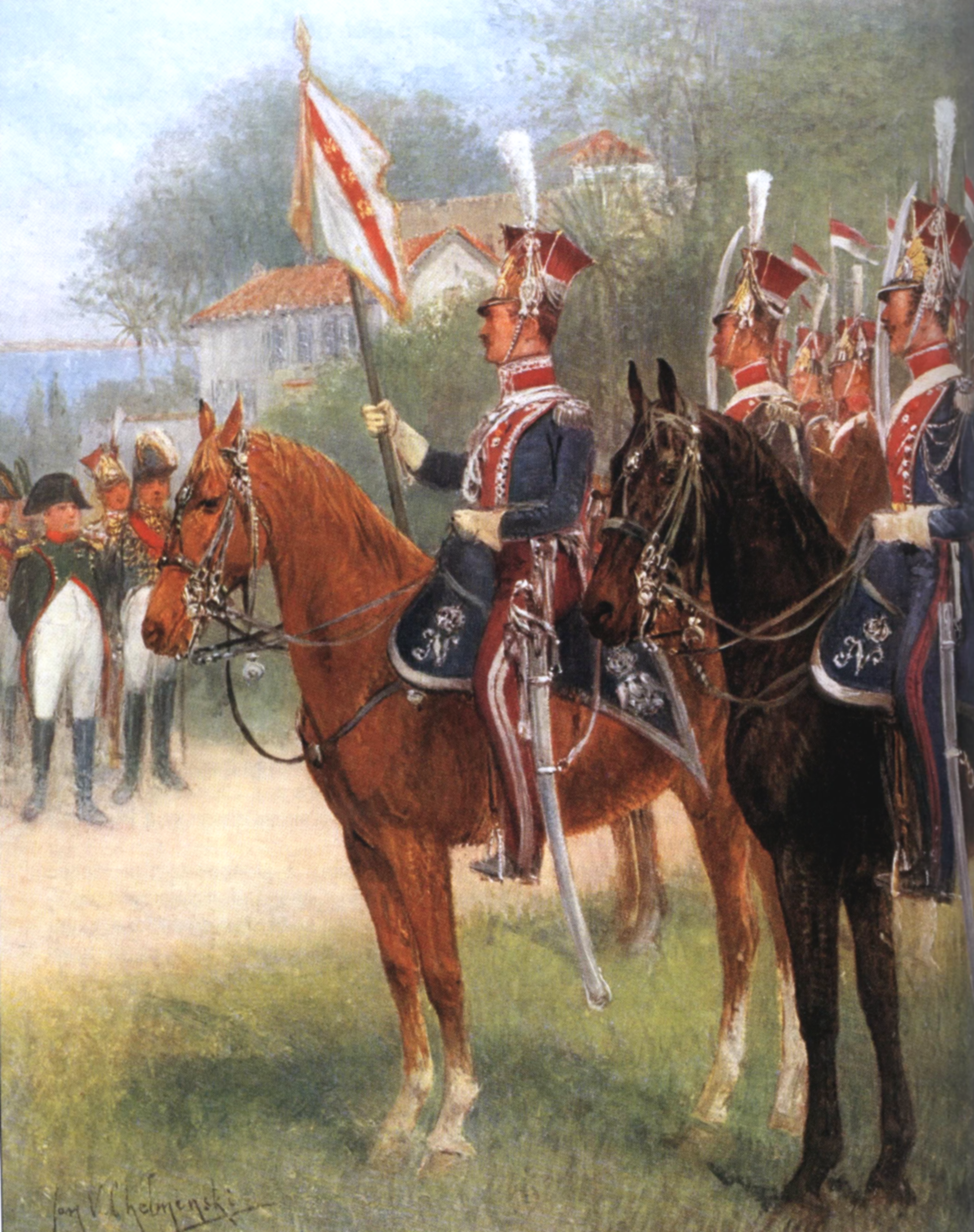
Napoleon with the Elba Squadron of volunteers from the 1st Polish Light Cavalry of his Imperial Guard

Napoleon spent only 9 months and 21 days in an uneasy forced retirement on Elba (1814–1815), watching events in France with great interest as the Congress of Vienna gradually gathered. As he foresaw, the shrinkage of the great Empire into the realm of old France caused intense dissatisfaction among the French, a feeling fed by stories of the tactless way in which the Bourbon princes treated veterans of the Grande Armée and the returning royalist nobility treated the people at large. Equally threatening was the general situation in Europe, which had been stressed and exhausted during the previous decades of near constant warfare.

The conflicting demands of major powers were for a time so exorbitant as to bring the Powers at the Congress of Vienna to the verge of war with each other. Thus every scrap of news reaching remote Elba looked favourable to Napoleon to retake power as he correctly reasoned the news of his return would cause a popular rising as he approached. He also reasoned that the return of French prisoners from Russia, Germany, Britain and Spain would furnish him instantly with a trained, veteran and patriotic army far larger than that which had won renown in the years before 1814. So threatening were the symptoms, that the royalists at Paris and the plenipotentiaries at Vienna talked of deporting him to the Azores or to Saint Helena, while others hinted at assassination.

=== Congress of Vienna ===
At the Congress of Vienna (November 1814 – June 1815) the various participating nations had very different and conflicting goals. Tsar Alexander I of Russia had expected to absorb much of Poland and to leave a Polish puppet state, the Duchy of Warsaw, as a buffer against further invasion from Europe. The renewed Prussian state demanded all of the Kingdom of Saxony. Austria wanted to allow neither of these things, while it expected to regain control of northern Italy. Castlereagh, of the United Kingdom, supported France (represented by Talleyrand) and Austria and was at variance with his own Parliament. This almost caused a war to break out, when the Tsar pointed out to Castlereagh that Russia had 450,000 men near Poland and Saxony and he was welcome to try to remove them. Indeed, Alexander stated "I shall be the King of Poland and the King of Prussia will be the King of Saxony". Castlereagh approached King Frederick William III of Prussia to offer him British and Austrian support for Prussia's annexation of Saxony in return for Prussia's support of an independent Poland. The Prussian king repeated this offer in public, offending Alexander so deeply that he challenged Metternich of Austria to a duel. Only the intervention of the Austrian crown stopped it. A breach among the four Great Powers was avoided when members of Britain's Parliament sent word to the Russian ambassador that Castlereagh had exceeded his authority, and Britain would not support an independent Poland. The affair left Prussia deeply suspicious of any British involvement.

== Return to France ==
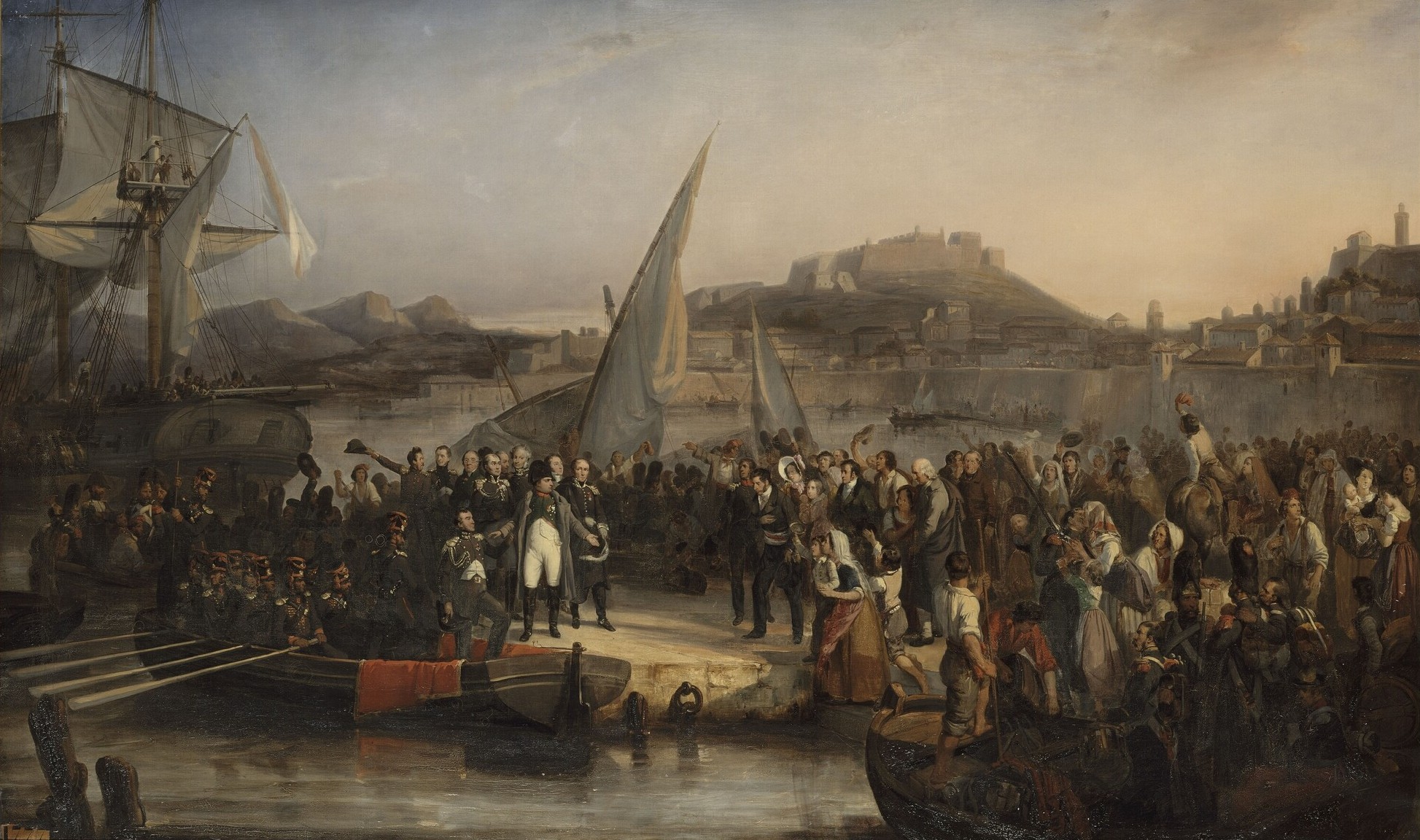
Napoleon's Departure from Elba by Joseph Beaume, 1836

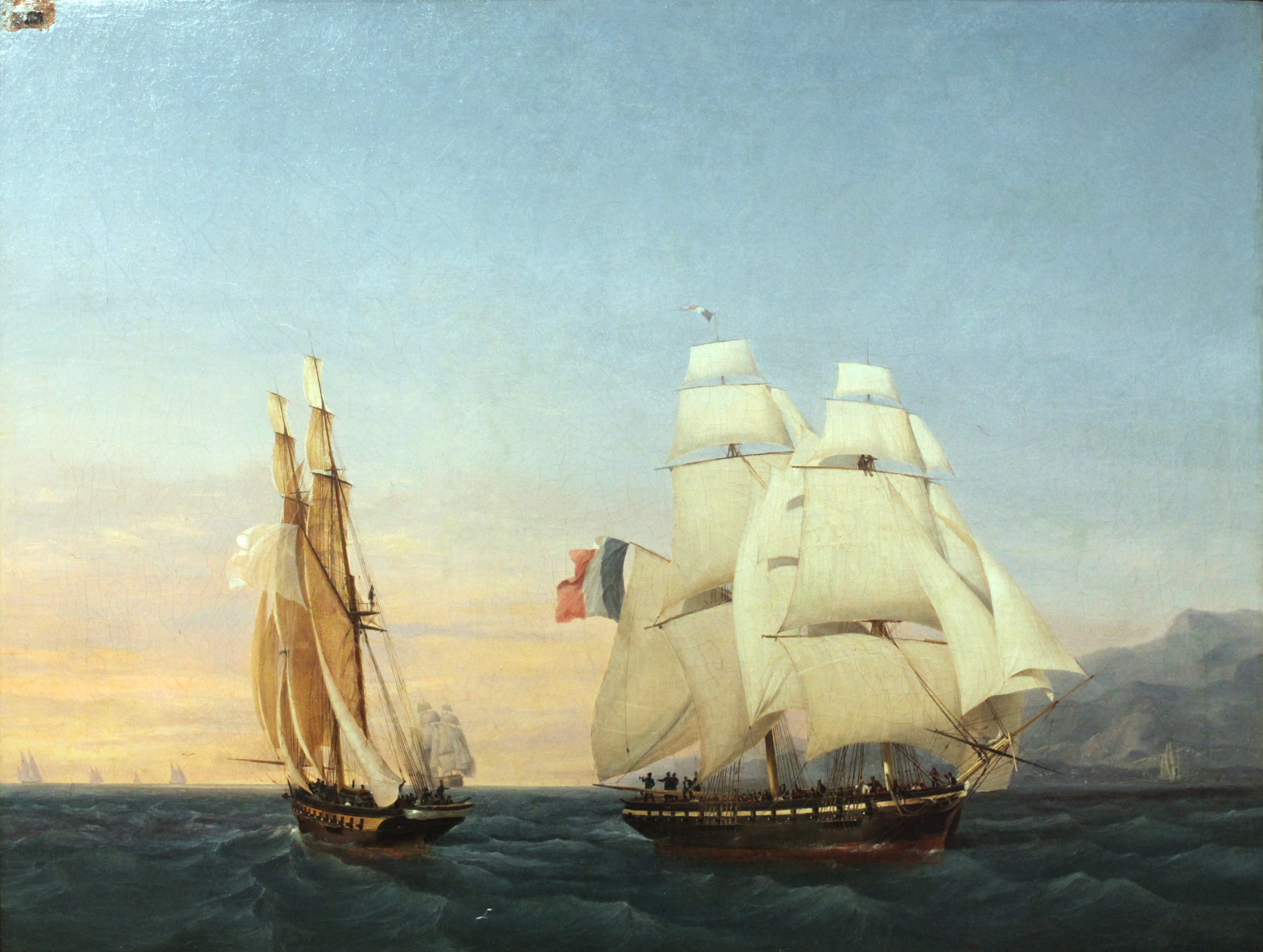
The brig Inconstant, under Captain Taillade and ferrying Napoleon to France, crosses the path of the brig Zéphir, under Captain Andrieux. Inconstant flies the tricolour of the Empire, while Zéphir flies the white ensign of the House of Bourbon.

While the Allies were distracted, Napoleon solved his problem in characteristic fashion. On 26 February 1815, when the British and French guard ships were absent, his tiny fleet, consisting of the brig Inconstant, four small transports, and two feluccas, slipped away from Portoferraio with some 1,000 men and landed at Golfe-Juan, between Cannes and Antibes, on 1 March 1815. Except in royalist Provence, he was warmly received. He avoided much of Provence by taking a route through the Alps, marked today as the Route Napoléon.

Firing no shot in his defence, his troop numbers swelled until they became an army. On 5 March, the nominally royalist 5th Infantry Regiment at Grenoble went over to Napoleon en masse. The next day they were joined by the 7th Infantry Regiment under its colonel, Charles de la Bédoyère, who would be executed for treason by the Bourbons after the campaign ended. An anecdote illustrates Napoleon's charisma: when royalist troops were deployed to stop the march of Napoleon's force before Grenoble at Laffrey, Napoleon stepped out in front of them, ripped open his coat and said "If any of you will shoot his Emperor, here I am." The men joined his cause.

Marshal Ney, now one of Louis XVIII's commanders, had said that Napoleon ought to be brought to Paris in an iron cage, but, on 14 March, in Lons-le-Saunier, Jura Ney joined Napoleon with a small army of 6,000 men. On 15 March Joachim Murat, King of Naples, declared war on Austria in an attempt to save his throne, starting the Neapolitan War. On 20 March, after proceeding through the countryside promising constitutional reform and direct elections to an assembly, to the acclaim of gathered crowds, Napoleon entered the capital, from where Louis XVIII had recently fled. He appointed the French Government of the Hundred Days that day.

The royalists did not pose a major threat: the duc d'Angoulême raised a small force in the south, but at Valence it did not provide resistance against Imperialists under Grouchy's command; and the duke, on 9 April 1815, signed a convention whereby the royalists received a free pardon from the Emperor. The royalists of Vendée moved later and caused more difficulty for the Imperialists. Ney was arrested on 3 August 1815, tried on 16 November and executed on 7 December 1815.

=== Napoleon's health ===
Evidence as to Napoleon's health is somewhat conflicting: Carnot, Pasquier, Lavalette, Thiébault and others thought him prematurely aged and enfeebled. At Elba Sir Neil Campbell had noted that he had become inactive and corpulent. Also at Elba he had begun to suffer intermittently from retention of urine, but to no serious extent. For much of his public life, Napoleon had been troubled by hemorrhoids, which made sitting on a horse for long periods of time difficult and painful. This condition had disastrous results at Waterloo; during the battle, his inability to sit on his horse for other than very short periods of time interfered with his ability to survey his troops in combat and thus exercise command. Others reported no marked change in him. Mollien, who knew the emperor well, attributed the lassitude which now and then came over him to a feeling of perplexity caused by his changed circumstances.

=== Constitutional reform ===
At Lyon, on 13 March 1815, Napoleon issued an edict dissolving the existing chambers and ordering the convocation of a national mass meeting, or Champ de Mai, for the purpose of modifying the constitution of the Napoleonic empire. He reportedly told Benjamin Constant, "I am growing old. The repose of a constitutional king may suit me. It will more surely suit my son".

That work was carried out by Benjamin Constant in concert with the Emperor. The resulting Acte additionel (supplementary to the constitutions of the Empire) bestowed on France a hereditary Chamber of Peers and a Chamber of Representatives elected by the "electoral colleges" of the empire.

According to Chateaubriand, in reference to Louis XVIII's constitutional charter, the new constitution – dubbed La Benjamine – was merely a "slightly improved" version of the charter associated with Louis XVIII's administration; however, later historians, including Agatha Ramm, have pointed out that this constitution permitted the extension of the franchise and explicitly guaranteed press freedom. In the Republican manner, the Constitution was put to the people of France in a plebiscite, but whether due to lack of enthusiasm, or because the nation was suddenly thrown into military preparation, only 1,532,527 votes were cast, less than half of the vote in the plebiscites of the Consulat; however, the benefit of a "large majority" meant that Napoleon felt he had constitutional sanction.

Napoleon was with difficulty dissuaded from quashing the 3 June election of Jean Denis, comte Lanjuinais, the staunch liberal who had so often opposed the Emperor, as president of the Chamber of Representatives. In his last communication to them, Napoleon warned them not to imitate the Greeks of the late Byzantine Empire, who engaged in subtle discussions while the ram was battering at their gates.

== Military mobilisation ==
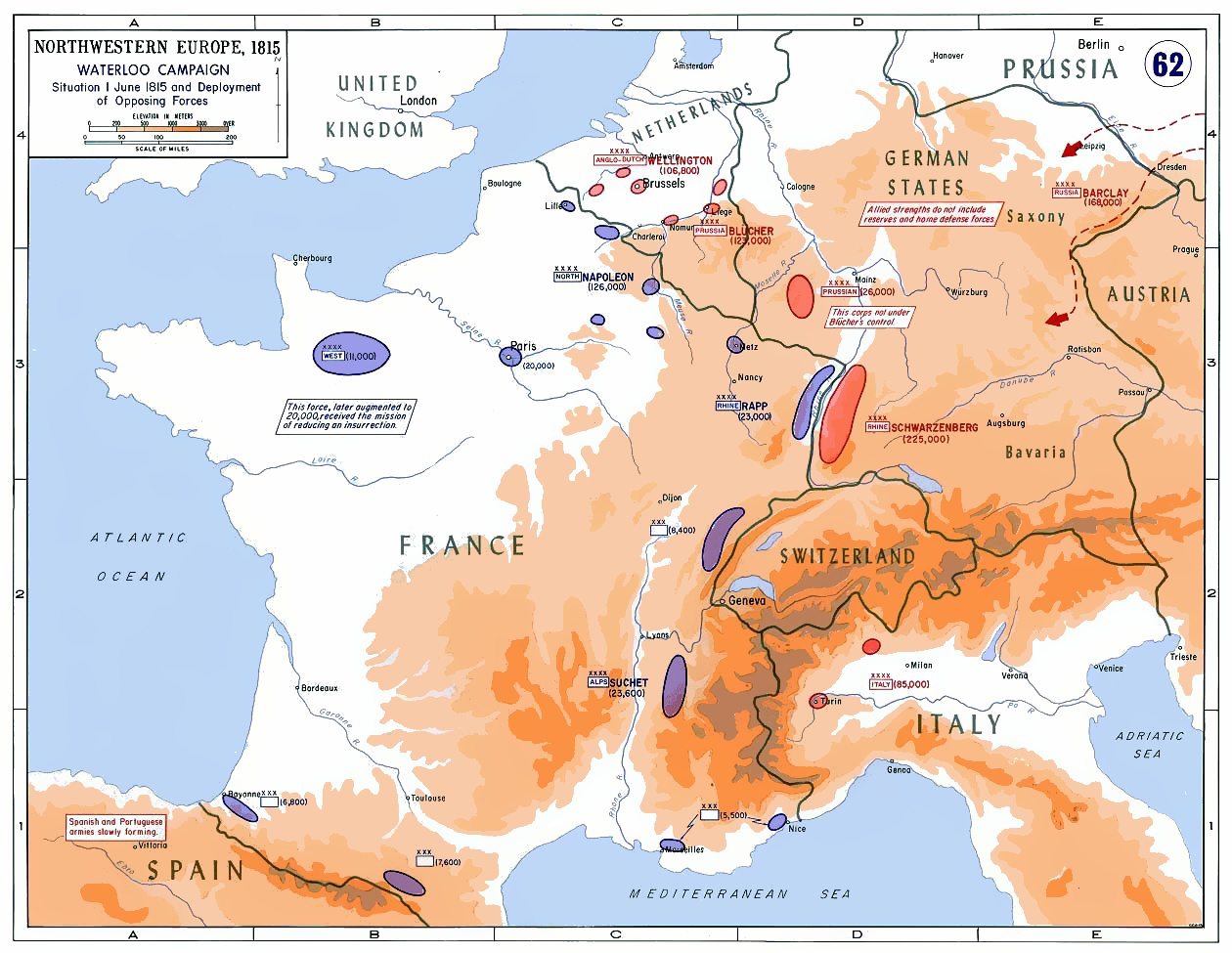
Strategic situation in Western Europe in 1815: 250,000 Frenchmen faced a coalition of about 850,000 soldiers on four fronts. In addition, Napoleon had to leave 20,000 men in Western France to reduce a royalist insurrection.

During the Hundred Days the Coalition nations as well as Napoleon mobilised for war. Upon re-assumption of the throne, Napoleon found that Louis XVIII had left him with few resources. There were 56,000 soldiers, of which 46,000 were ready to campaign. By the end of May the total armed forces available to Napoleon had reached 198,000 with 66,000 more in depots training up but not yet ready for deployment. By the end of May Napoleon had formed L'Armée du Nord (the "Army of the North") which, led by himself, would participate in the Waterloo Campaign.

For the defence of France, Napoleon deployed his remaining forces within France with the intention of delaying his foreign enemies while he suppressed his domestic ones. By June he had organised his forces thus:

- V Corps, – L'Armée du Rhin – commanded by Rapp, cantoned near Strasbourg;
- VII Corps – L'Armée des Alpes – commanded by Suchet, cantoned at Lyon;
- I Corps of Observation – L'Armée du Jura – commanded by Lecourbe, cantoned at Belfort;
- II Corps of Observation – L'Armée du Var – commanded by Brune, based at Toulon;
- III Corps of Observation – Army of the Pyrenees orientales – commanded by Decaen, based at Toulouse;
- IV Corps of Observation – Army of the Pyrenees occidentales – commanded by Clauzel, based at Bordeaux;
- Army of the West, – Armée de l'Ouest (also known as the Army of the Vendée and the Army of the Loire) – commanded by Lamarque, was formed to suppress the Royalist insurrection in the Vendée department of France which remained loyal to King Louis XVIII during the Hundred Days.

The opposing Coalition forces were the following:

Archduke Charles gathered Austrian and allied German states, while the Prince of Schwarzenberg formed another Austrian army. King Ferdinand VII of Spain summoned British officers to lead his troops against France. Tsar Alexander I of Russia mustered an army of 250,000 troops and sent these rolling toward the Rhine. Prussia mustered two armies. One under von Blücher took post alongside Wellington's British army and its allies. The other was the North German Corps under General Kleist.

- Assessed as an immediate threat by Napoleon:
  - Anglo-allied, commanded by Wellington, cantoned south-west of Brussels, headquartered at Brussels.
  - Prussian Army commanded by von Blücher, cantoned south-east of Brussels, headquartered at Namur.
- Close to the borders of France but assessed to be less of a threat by Napoleon:
  - The German Corps (North German Federal Army) which was part of von Blücher's army, but was acting independently south of the main Prussian army. Von Blücher summoned it to join the main army once Napoleon's intentions became known.
  - The Austrian Army of the Upper Rhine, commanded by Field Marshal Karl Philipp, Prince of Schwarzenberg.
  - The Swiss Army, commanded by Niklaus Franz von Bachmann.
  - The Austrian Army of Upper Italy – Austro-Sardinian Army – commanded by Johann Maria Philipp Frimont.
  - The Austrian Army of Naples, commanded by Frederick Bianchi, Duke of Casalanza.
- Other coalition forces which were either converging on France, mobilised to defend the homelands, or in the process of mobilisation included:
  - A Russian Army, commanded by Michael Andreas Barclay de Tolly, marching towards France
  - A Reserve Russian Army to support Barclay de Tolly if required.
  - A Reserve Prussian Army stationed at home in order to defend its borders.
  - An Anglo-Sicilian Army under General Sir Hudson Lowe, which was to be landed by the Royal Navy on the southern French coast.
  - Two Spanish Armies were assembling and planning to invade over the Pyrenees.
  - A Netherlands Corps, under Prince Frederick of the Netherlands, was not present at Waterloo but as a corps in Wellington's army it did take part in minor military actions during the Coalition's invasion of France.
  - A Danish contingent known as the Royal Danish Auxiliary Corps (commanded by General Prince Frederik of Hesse) and a Hanseatic contingent (from the free cities of Bremen, Lübeck and Hamburg) later commanded by the British Colonel Sir Neil Campbell, were on their way to join Wellington; both however, joined the army in July having missed the conflict.
  - A Portuguese contingent, which due to the speed of events never assembled.

== War begins ==
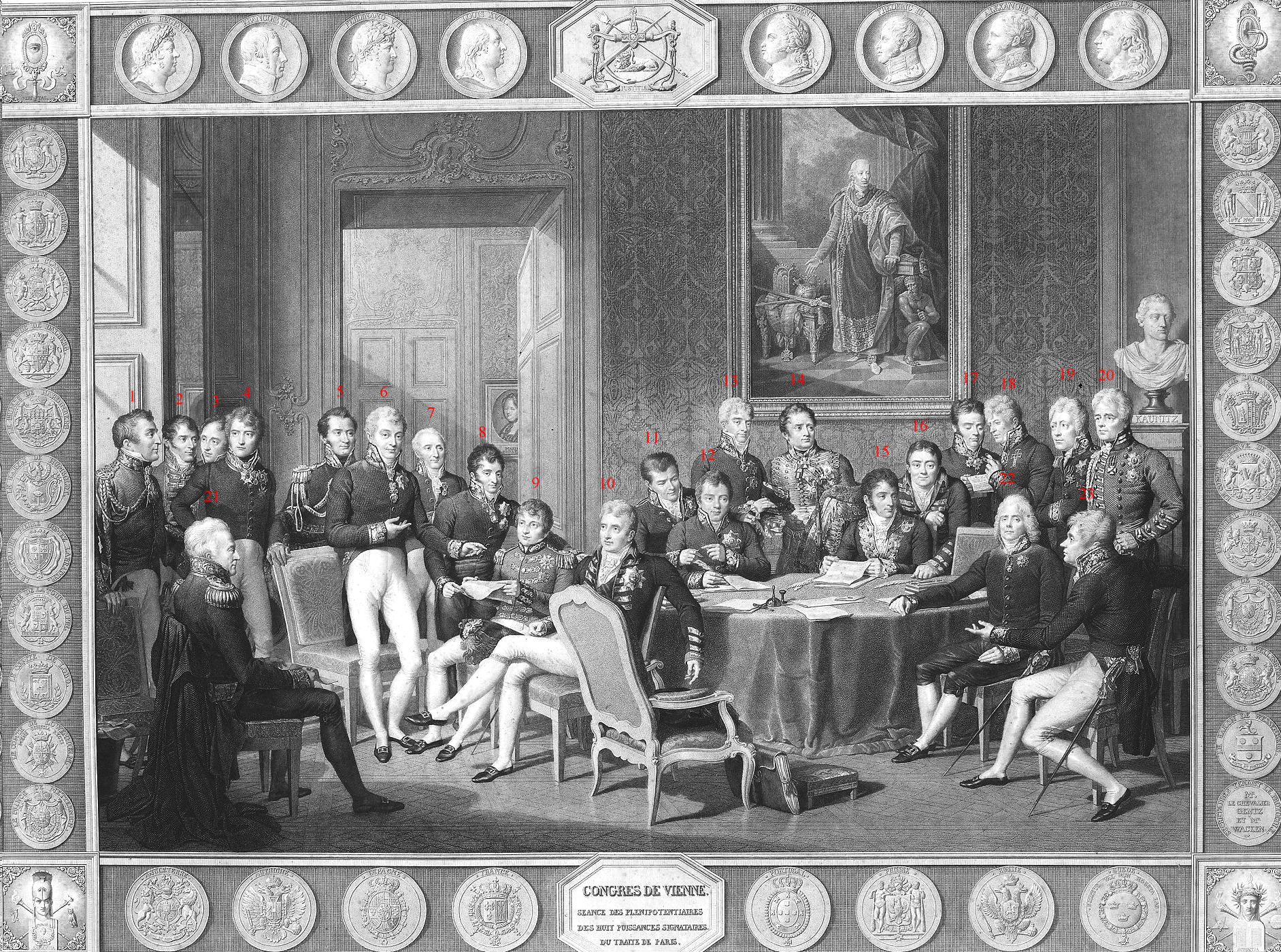
Plenipotentiaries at the Congress of Vienna

At the Congress of Vienna, the Great Powers of Europe (Austria, Great Britain, Prussia and Russia) and their allies declared Napoleon an outlaw, and with the signing of this declaration on 13 March 1815, so began the War of the Seventh Coalition. The hopes of peace that Napoleon had entertained were gone – war was now inevitable.

A further treaty (the Treaty of Alliance against Napoleon) was ratified on 25 March, in which each of the Great European Powers agreed to pledge 150,000 men for the coming conflict. Such a number was not possible for the British however, as her standing army was smaller than those of her three peers. Besides, her forces were scattered around the globe, with many units still in Canada, where the War of 1812 had recently ended. With this in mind, she made up her numerical deficiencies by paying subsidies to the other Powers and to the other states of Europe who would contribute contingents.

Some time after the allies had begun mobilising, it was agreed that the planned invasion of France was to commence on 1 July 1815, much later than both von Blücher and Wellington would have liked, as both their armies were ready in June, ahead of the Austrians and Russians; the latter were still some distance away. The advantage of this later invasion date was that it allowed all the invading Coalition armies a chance to be ready at the same time. They could deploy their combined, numerically superior forces against Napoleon's smaller, thinly spread forces, thus ensuring his defeat and avoiding a possible defeat within the borders of France. Yet this postponed invasion date allowed Napoleon more time to strengthen his forces and defences, which would make defeating him harder and more costly in lives, time and money.

Napoleon now had to decide whether to fight a defensive or offensive campaign. Defence would entail repeating the 1814 campaign in France, but with much larger numbers of troops at his disposal. France's chief cities (Paris and Lyon) would be fortified and two great French armies, the larger before Paris and the smaller before Lyon, would protect them; francs-tireurs would be encouraged, giving the Coalition armies their own taste of guerrilla warfare.

Napoleon chose to attack, which entailed a pre-emptive strike at his enemies before they were all fully assembled and able to co-operate. By destroying some of the major Coalition armies, Napoleon believed he would then be able to bring the governments of the Seventh Coalition to the peace table to discuss terms favourable to himself: namely, peace for France, with himself remaining in power as its head. If peace were rejected by the Coalition powers, despite any pre-emptive military success he might have achieved using the offensive military option available to him, then the war would continue and he could turn his attention to defeating the rest of the Coalition armies.

Napoleon's decision to attack in Belgium was supported by several considerations. First, he had learned that the British and Prussian armies were widely dispersed and might be defeated in detail. Further, the British troops in Belgium were largely second-line troops; most of the veterans of the Peninsular War had been sent to America to fight the War of 1812. And, politically, a French victory might trigger a friendly revolution in French-speaking Brussels.

== Waterloo campaign ==
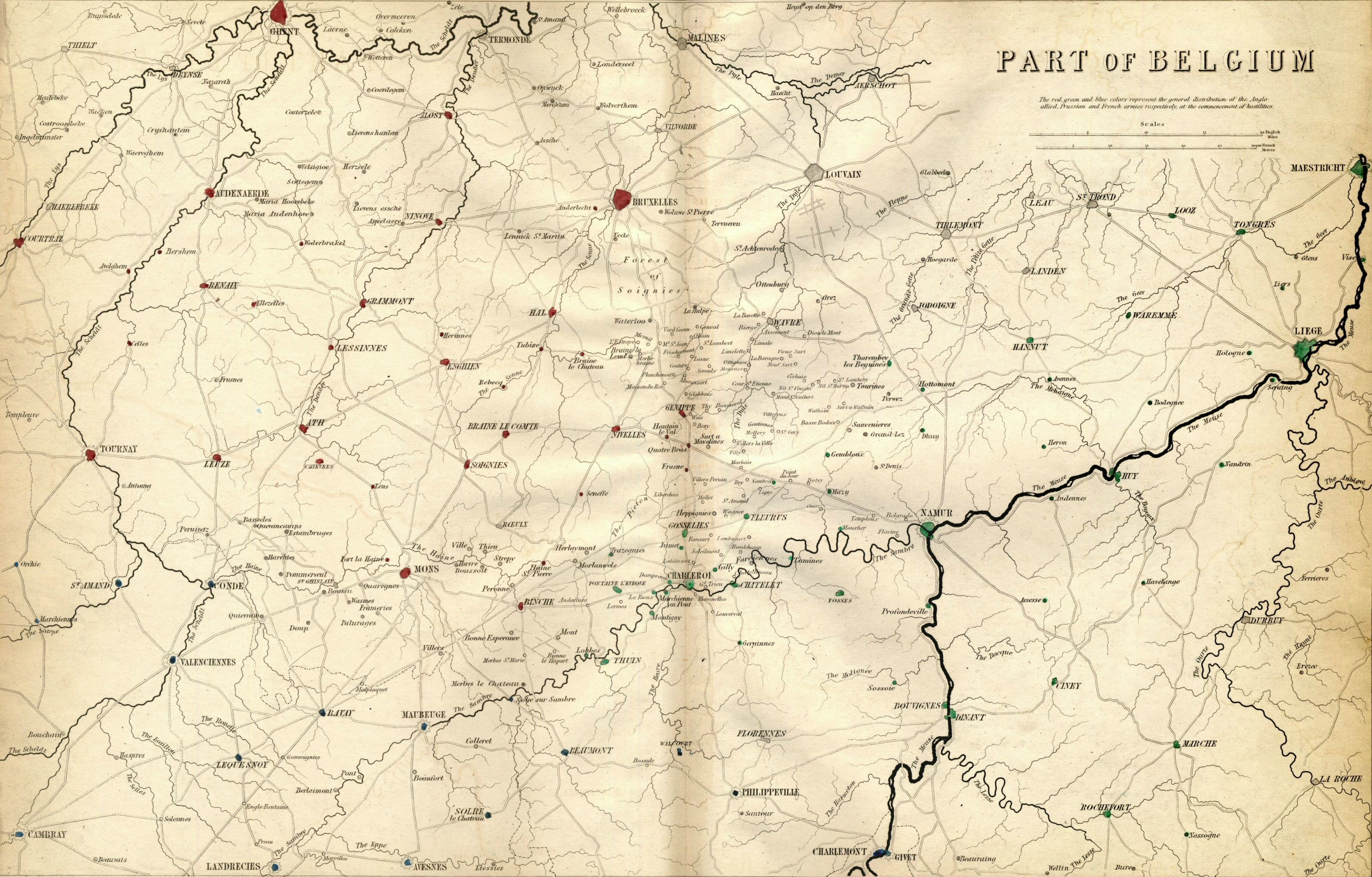
A portion of Belgium with some places marked in colour to indicate the initial deployments of the armies just before the commencement of hostilities on 15 June 1815, with British forces in red, Prussians in green, and French in blue

The Waterloo Campaign (15 June – 8 July 1815) was fought between the French Army of the North and two Seventh Coalition armies: an Anglo-allied army and a Prussian army. Initially the French army was commanded by Napoleon Bonaparte, but he left for Paris after the French defeat at the Battle of Waterloo. Command then rested on Marshals Soult and Grouchy, who were in turn replaced by Marshal Davout, who took command at the request of the French Provisional Government. The Anglo-allied army was commanded by the Duke of Wellington and the Prussian army by Prince von Blücher.

=== Start of hostilities (15 June) ===
Hostilities started on 15 June when the French drove in the Prussian outposts and crossed the Sambre at Charleroi and secured Napoleon's favoured "central position"—at the junction between the cantonment areas of Wellington's army (to the west) and von Blücher's army to the east.

=== Battles of Quatre Bras and Ligny (16 June) ===
Map of the Waterloo campaign

On 16 June, the French prevailed, with Marshal Ney commanding the left wing of the French army holding Wellington at the Battle of Quatre Bras and Napoleon defeating von Blücher at the Battle of Ligny.

=== Interlude (17 June) ===
On 17 June, Napoleon left Grouchy with the right wing of the French army to pursue the Prussians, while he took the reserves and command of the left wing of the army to pursue Wellington towards Brussels. On the night of 17 June, the Anglo-allied army turned and prepared for battle on a gentle escarpment, about 1 mile (1.6 km) south of the village of Waterloo.

=== Battle of Waterloo (18 June) ===
The next day, the Battle of Waterloo proved to be the decisive battle of the campaign. The Anglo-allied army stood fast against repeated French attacks, until with the aid of several Prussian corps that arrived on the east of the battlefield in the early evening, they managed to rout the French Army. Grouchy, with the right wing of the army, engaged a Prussian rearguard at the simultaneous Battle of Wavre, and although he won a tactical victory, his failure to prevent the Prussians marching to Waterloo meant that his actions contributed to the French defeat at Waterloo. The next day (19 June), Grouchy left Wavre and started a long retreat back to Paris.

=== Invasion of France ===
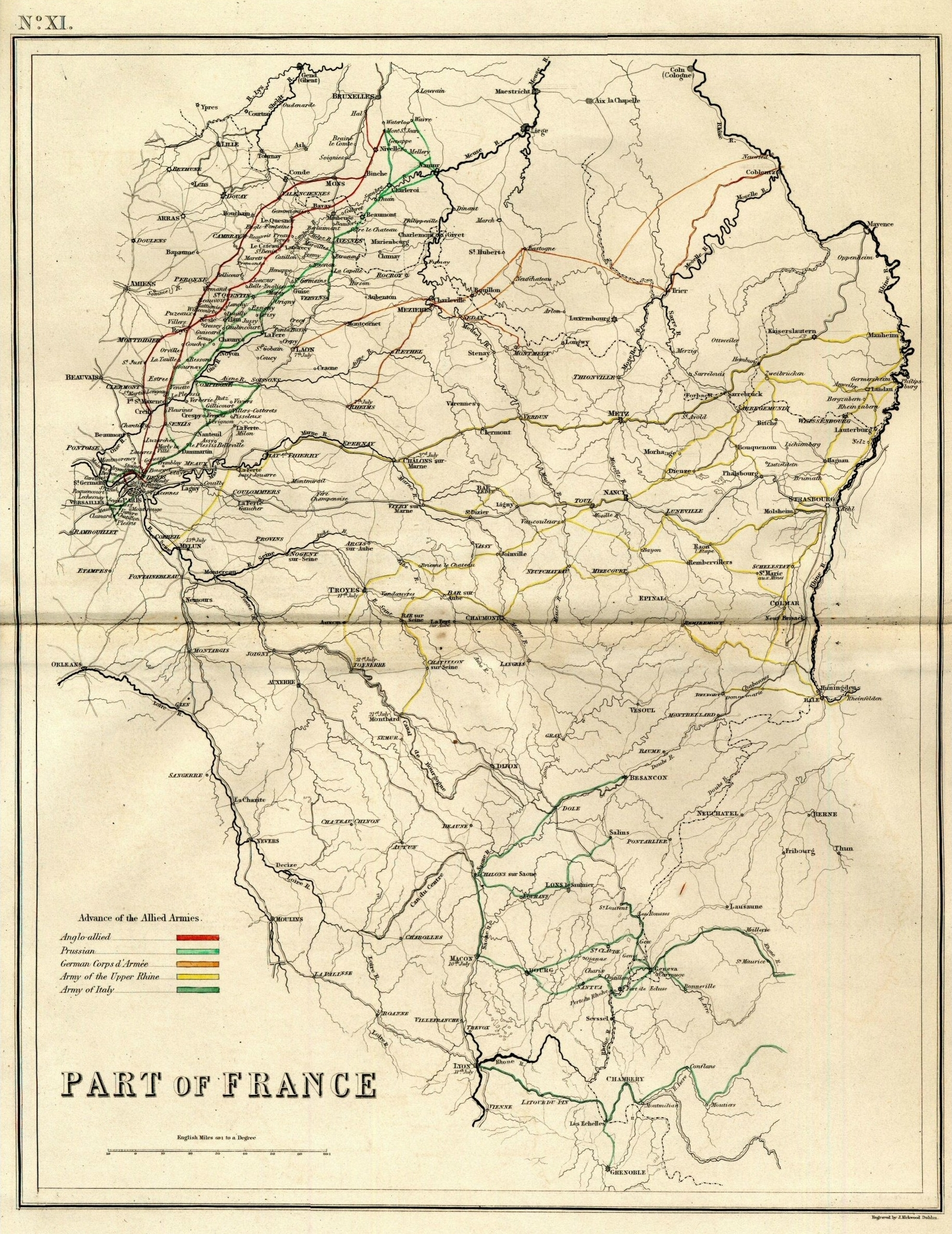
Invasion of France by the Seventh Coalition armies in 1815

After the defeat at Waterloo, Napoleon chose not to remain with the army and attempt to rally it, but return to Paris to try to secure political support for further action. This he failed to do. The two Coalition armies hotly pursued the French army to the gates of Paris, during which time the French, on occasion, turned and fought some delaying actions, in which thousands of men were killed.

=== Abdication of Napoleon (22 June) ===
On arriving at Paris, three days after Waterloo, Napoleon still clung to the hope of concerted national resistance, but the temper of the two chambers of Parliament and of the public generally forbade any such attempt. Napoleon and his brother Lucien Bonaparte were almost alone in believing that, by dissolving the chambers and declaring Napoleon dictator, they could save France from the armies of the powers now converging on Paris. Even Davout, minister of war, advised Napoleon that the destiny of France rested solely with the chambers. Clearly, it was time to safeguard what remained, and that could best be done under Talleyrand's shield of legitimacy. Jean Jacques Régis de Cambacérès was the minister of justice during this time and was a close confidant of Napoleon.

Napoleon himself at last recognised the truth. When Lucien pressed him to "dare", he replied, "Alas, I have dared only too much already". On 22 June 1815 he abdicated in favour of his son, Napoleon II, well knowing that it was a formality, as his four-year-old son was in Austria.

=== French Provisional Government ===
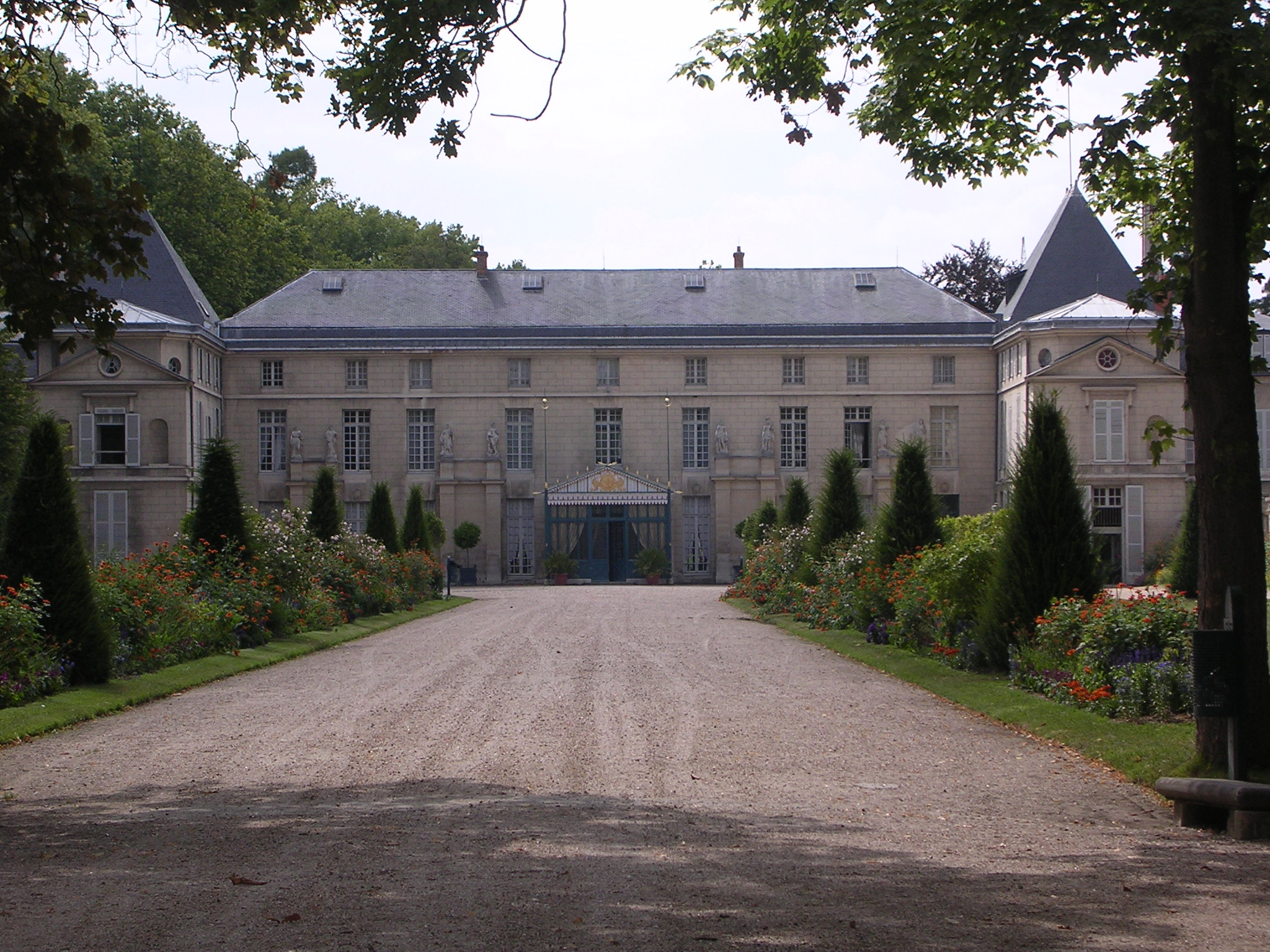
The Château de Malmaison

With the abdication of Napoleon, a provisional government with Joseph Fouché as President of the Executive Commission was formed, under the nominal authority of Napoleon II.

Initially, the remnants of the French Army of the North (the left wing and the reserves) that was routed at Waterloo were commanded by Marshal Soult, while Grouchy kept command of the right wing that had fought at Wavre. However, on 25 June, Soult was relieved of his command by the Provisional Government and was replaced by Grouchy, who in turn was placed under the command of Marshal Davout.

On the same day, 25 June, Napoleon received from Fouché, the president of the newly appointed provisional government (and Napoleon's former police chief), an intimation that he must leave Paris. He retired to Malmaison, the former home of Joséphine, where she had died shortly after his first abdication.

On 29 June, the near approach of the Prussians, who had orders to seize Napoleon, dead or alive, caused him to retire westwards toward Rochefort, whence he hoped to reach the United States. The presence of blockading Royal Navy warships under Vice Admiral Henry Hotham, with orders to prevent his escape, forestalled this plan.

=== Coalition forces enter Paris (7 July) ===
French troops concentrated in Paris had as many soldiers as the invaders and more cannons. There were two major skirmishes and a few minor ones near Paris during the first few days of July. In the first major skirmish, the Battle of Rocquencourt, on 1 July, French dragoons, supported by infantry and commanded by General Exelmans, destroyed a Prussian brigade of hussars under the command of Colonel von Sohr (who was severely wounded and taken prisoner during the skirmish), before retreating. In the second skirmish, on 3 July, General Dominique Vandamme (under Davout's command) was decisively defeated by General von Zieten (under von Blücher's command) at the Battle of Issy, forcing the French to retreat into Paris.

With this defeat, all hope of holding Paris faded and the French Provisional Government authorised delegates to accept capitulation terms, which led to the Convention of St. Cloud (the surrender of Paris) and the end of hostilities between France and the armies of von Blücher and Wellington.

On 4 July, under the terms of the Convention of St. Cloud, the French army, commanded by Marshal Davout, left Paris and proceeded to cross the river Loire. The Anglo-allied troops occupied Saint-Denis, Saint Ouen, Clichy and Neuilly. On 5 July, the Anglo-allied army took possession of Montmartre. On 6 July, the Anglo-allied troops occupied the Barriers of Paris, on the right of the Seine, while the Prussians occupied those upon the left bank.

On 7 July, the two Coalition armies, with von Zieten's Prussian I Corps as the vanguard, entered Paris. The Chamber of Peers, having received from the Provisional Government a notification of the course of events, terminated its sittings; the Chamber of Representatives protested, but in vain. Their President (Lanjuinais) resigned his chair, and on the following day, the doors were closed and the approaches guarded by Coalition troops.

== Restoration of Louis XVIII (8 July) ==
On 8 July, the French King, Louis XVIII, made his public entry into Paris, amidst the acclamations of the people, and again occupied the throne.

During Louis XVIII's entry into Paris, Count Chabrol, prefect of the department of the Seine, accompanied by the municipal body, addressed the King, in the name of his companions, in a speech that began "Sire,—One hundred days have passed away since your majesty, forced to tear yourself from your dearest affections, left your capital amidst tears and public consternation. ...".

== Surrender of Napoleon (15 July) ==
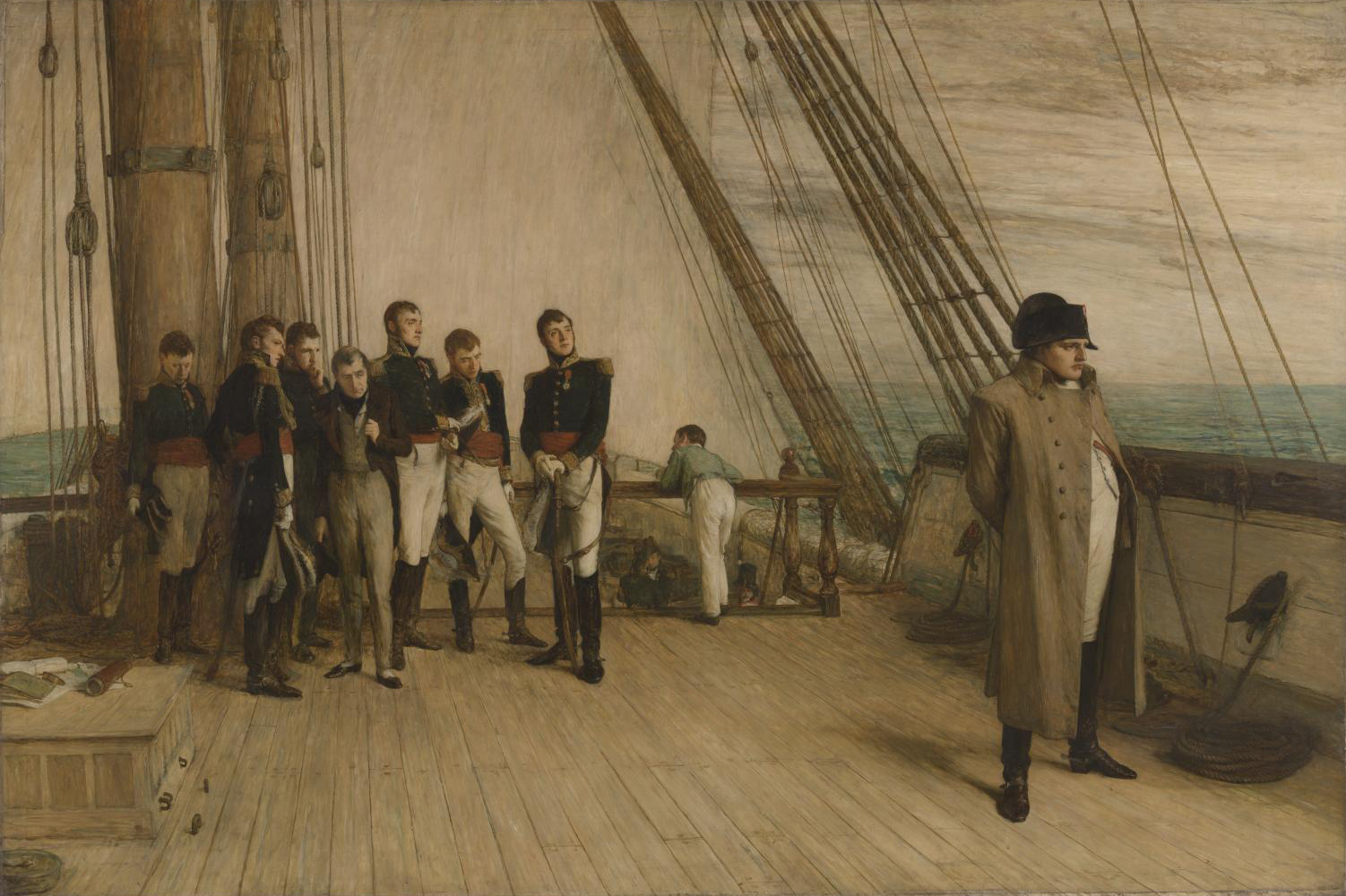
Napoleon on Board the Bellerophon, exhibited in 1880 by Sir William Quiller Orchardson. Orchardson depicts the morning of 23 July 1815, as Napoleon watches the French shoreline recede.

Unable to remain in France or escape from it, Napoleon surrendered to Captain Frederick Maitland of HMS Bellerophon in the early morning of 15 July 1815 and was transported to England. Napoleon was taken to the island of Saint Helena where he died a prisoner in May 1821.

== Other campaigns and wars ==
While Napoleon had assessed that the Coalition forces in and around Brussels on the borders of north-east France posed the greatest threat, because Tolly's Russian army of 150,000 were still not in the theatre, Spain was slow to mobilise, Prince Schwarzenberg's Austrian army of 210,000 were slow to cross the Rhine, and another Austrian force menacing the south-eastern frontier of France was still not a direct threat, Napoleon still had to place some badly needed forces in positions where they could defend France against other Coalition forces whatever the outcome of the Waterloo campaign.

=== Neapolitan War ===
The Neapolitan War between the Napoleonic Kingdom of Naples and the Austrian Empire started on 15 March 1815 when Marshal Joachim Murat declared war on Austria, and ended on 20 May 1815 with the signing of the Treaty of Casalanza.

Napoleon had made his brother-in-law, Joachim Murat, King of Naples on 1 August 1808. After Napoleon's defeat in 1813, Murat reached an agreement with Austria to save his own throne. However, he realized that the European Powers, meeting as the Congress of Vienna, planned to remove him and return Naples to its Bourbon rulers. So, after issuing the so-called Rimini Proclamation urging Italian patriots to fight for independence, Murat moved north to fight against the Austrians, who were the greatest threat to his rule.

The war was triggered by a pro-Napoleon uprising in Naples, after which Murat declared war on Austria on 15 March 1815, five days before Napoleon's return to Paris. The Austrians were prepared for war. Their suspicions were aroused weeks earlier, when Murat applied for permission to march through Austrian territory to attack the south of France. Austria had reinforced her armies in Lombardy under the command of Bellegarde prior to war being declared.

The war ended after a decisive Austrian victory at the Battle of Tolentino. Ferdinand IV was reinstated as King of Naples. Ferdinand then sent Neapolitan troops under General Onasco to help the Austrian army in Italy attack southern France. In the long term, the intervention by Austria caused resentment in Italy, which further spurred on the drive towards Italian unification.

=== Civil war ===
Provence and Brittany, which were known to contain many royalist sympathisers, did not rise in open revolt, but Vendée did. The Vendée Royalists successfully took Bressuire and Cholet, before they were defeated by General Lamarque at the Battle of Rocheserviere on 20 June. They signed the Treaty of Cholet six days later on 26 June.

=== Austrian campaign ===
==== Rhine frontier ====
In early June, General Rapp's Army of the Rhine of about 23,000 men, with a leavening of experienced troops, advanced towards Germersheim to block Schwarzenberg's expected advance, but on hearing the news of the French defeat at Waterloo, Rapp withdrew towards Strasbourg turning on 28 June to check the 40,000 men of General Württemberg's Austrian III Corps at the Battle of La Suffel—the last pitched battle of the Napoleonic Wars and a French victory. The next day Rapp continued to retreat to Strasbourg and also sent a garrison to defend Colmar. He and his men took no further active part in the campaign and eventually submitted to the Bourbons.

To the north of Württenberg's III Corps, General von Wrede's Austrian (Bavarian) IV Corps also crossed the French frontier, and then swung south and captured Nancy, against some local popular resistance on 27 June. Attached to his command was a Russian detachment, under the command of General Count Lambert, that was charged with keeping von Wrede's lines of communication open. In early July, Schwarzenberg, having received a request from Wellington and von Blücher, ordered von Wrede to act as the Austrian vanguard and advance on Paris, and by 5 July, the main body of von Wrede's IV Corps had reached Châlons. On 6 July, the advance guard made contact with the Prussians, and on 7 July von Wrede received intelligence of the Paris Convention and a request to move to the Loire. By 10 July, Wrede's headquarters were at Ferté-sous-Jouarre and his corps positioned between the Seine and the Marne.

Further south, General von Colloredo's Austrian I Corps was hindered by General Lecourbe's Armée du Jura, which was largely made up of National Guardsmen and other reserves. Lecourbe fought four delaying actions between 30 June and 8 July at Foussemagne, Bourogne, Chèvremont and Bavilliers before agreeing to an armistice on 11 July. Archduke Ferdinand's Reserve Corps, together with Hohenzollern-Hechingen's II Corps, laid siege to the fortresses of Hüningen and Mühlhausen, with two Swiss brigades from the Swiss Army of General Niklaus Franz von Bachmann, aiding with the siege of Huningen. Like other Austrian forces, these too were pestered by francs-tireurs.

==== Italian frontier ====
Like Rapp further north, Marshal Suchet, with the Armée des Alpes, took the initiative and on 14 June invaded Savoy. Facing him was General Frimont, with an Austro-Sardinian army of 75,000 men based in Italy. However, on hearing of the defeat of Napoleon at Waterloo, Suchet negotiated an armistice and fell back to Lyons, where on 12 July he surrendered the city to Frimont's army.

The coast of Provence was defended by French forces under Marshal Brune, who fell back slowly into the fortress city of Toulon, after retreating from Marseilles before the Austrian Army of Naples under the command of General Bianchi, the Anglo-Sicilian forces of Sir Hudson Lowe, supported by the British Mediterranean fleet of Lord Exmouth, and the Sardinian forces of the Sardinian General d'Osasco, the forces of the latter being drawn from the garrison of Nice. Brune did not surrender the city and its naval arsenal until 31 July.

=== Russian campaign ===
The main body of the Russian Army, commanded by Field Marshal Count Tolly and amounting to 167,950 men, crossed the Rhine at Mannheim on 25 June—after Napoleon had abdicated for the second time—and although there was light resistance around Mannheim, it was over by the time the vanguard had advanced as far as Landau. The greater portion of Tolly's army reached Paris and its vicinity by the middle of July.

== Treaty of Paris ==
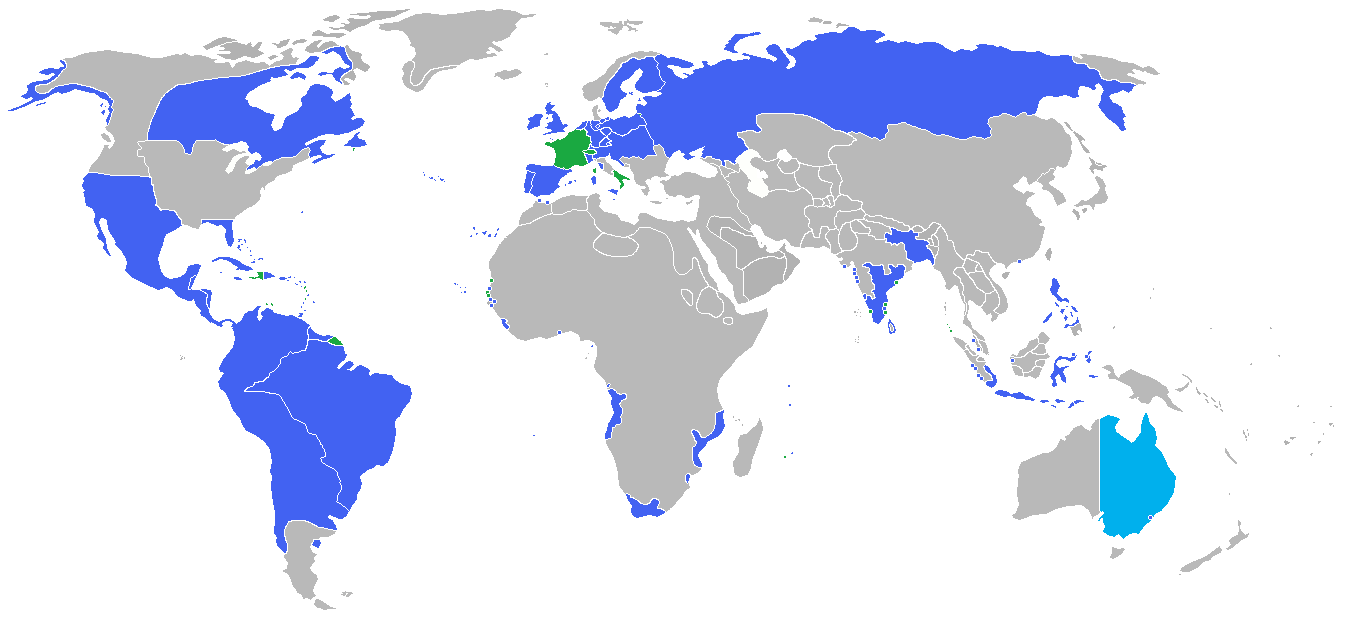
All the participants of the War of the Seventh Coalition. Blue: The Coalition and their colonies and allies. Green: The First French Empire, its protectorates, colonies and allies.

Issy was the last field engagement of the Hundred Days. There was a campaign against fortresses still commanded by Bonapartist governors that ended with the capitulation of Longwy on 13 September 1815. The Treaty of Paris was signed on 20 November 1815, bringing the Napoleonic Wars to a formal end.

Under the 1815 Paris treaty, the previous year's Treaty of Paris and the Final Act of the Congress of Vienna, of 9 June 1815, were confirmed. France was reduced to its 1790 boundaries; it lost the territorial gains of the Revolutionary armies in 1790–1792, which the previous Paris treaty had allowed France to keep. France was now also ordered to pay 700 million francs in indemnities, in five yearly installments, (Note: Article 4 of the Definitive Treaty of 20 November 1815. The 1814 treaty had required only that France honour some public and private debts incurred by the Napoleonic regime (Nicolle 1953, pp. 343–354), see Articles 18, 19 and 20 of the 1814 Paris Peace Treaty) and to maintain at its own expense a Coalition army of occupation of 150,000 soldiers in the eastern border territories of France, from the English Channel to the border with Switzerland, for a maximum of five years. (Note: The army of occupation and the Duke of Wellington's moderating transformation from soldier to statesman are discussed by Thomas Dwight Veve.) The two-fold purpose of the military occupation was made clear by the convention annexed to the treaty, outlining the incremental terms by which France would issue negotiable bonds covering the indemnity: in addition to safeguarding the neighbouring states from a revival of revolution in France, it guaranteed fulfilment of the treaty's financial clauses. (Note: A point made by Nicolle.)

On the same day, in a separate document, Great Britain, Russia, Austria and Prussia renewed the Quadruple Alliance. The princes and free towns who were not signatories were invited to accede to its terms, whereby the treaty became a part of the public law according to which Europe, with the exception of the Ottoman Empire, (Note: Turkey, which had been excluded from the Congress of Vienna by the express wish of Russia (Strupp 1960–1962, "Wiener Kongress").) established "relations from which a system of real and permanent balance of power in Europe is to be derived". (Note: The quote is from Article I of the Additional, Separate, and Secret Articles to the [Paris Peace Treaty] of 30th May, 1814 (Hertslet 1875, p. 18); it is quoted to support the sentence by Wood 1943, p. 263 and note 6 (Wood's main subject is the Treaty of Paris (1856), terminating the Crimean War).)

== See also ==
- Malplaquet proclamation issued to French by Wellington on 22 June 1815
- Napoleon's first abdication
- Lists of battles of the French Revolutionary Wars and Napoleonic Wars
  - List of battles of the Hundred Days
