= Pierre Hamelin =

French engineer

- Citizenship: French
- Education: Université de technologie de Belfort-Montbéliard
- Occupation: Engineer
- Employer: Racing Bulls
- Title: Race engineer

Pierre Hamelin is a French Formula One engineer. He is the race engineer for Arvid Lindblad at the Racing Bulls Formula One team. He was race engineer for Daniil Kvyat, Alex Albon, Pierre Gasly, Daniel Riccardo and Isack Hadjar.

== Career ==
Hamelin studied mechanical engineering at the UTBM. He began his Formula One career with the Renault F1 Team as an R&D engineer. When the Enstone-based outfit was rebranded as the Lotus F1 Team in 2012, he moved into a race support engineering role, a position he held through the 2013 season.

He joined Scuderia Toro Rosso in 2014 as a Performance Engineer, working with Daniil Kvyat during the Russian's rookie season, focusing on car set up and performance optimisation. In 2015 he continued in a similar capacity with Carlos Sainz, remaining with the Spaniard into the opening rounds of 2016. Following Kvyat's return to Toro Rosso midway through the 2016 season, Hamelin was promoted to Race Engineer. He engineered Kvyat through 2017 before working with Brendon Hartley during the closing stages of that season and throughout the 2018 campaign.

In 2019 Hamelin oversaw the transition between drivers during Red Bull's mid-season reshuffle, first engineering Alexander Albon and then Pierre Gasly following Gasly's return to Toro Rosso, helping guide the Frenchman to his maiden podium finish at the 2019 Brazilian Grand Prix. He remained Gasly's race engineer when the team transitioned into Scuderia AlphaTauri for 2020, engineering the Frenchman to his maiden Formula One victory at the 2020 Italian Grand Prix. Hamelin continued in this role through the 2021 and 2022 seasons, overseeing Gasly's race operations, set-up direction and performance development as AlphaTauri regularly competed in the midfield and scoring the occasional podium finish.

During 2023 Hamelin initially engineered Nyck de Vries before the Dutchman was replaced mid-season. He then worked with Daniel Ricciardo, whose campaign was interrupted by injury, leading reserve driver Liam Lawson to step in for several rounds. For 2024 Hamelin continued as race engineer to Ricciardo upon his return, before a further change saw Ricciardo released and Lawson reinstated. He remained with Lawson as the Faenza team transitioned into the rebranded Racing Bulls operation. He was assigned as Race Engineer to Isack Hadjar for the 2025 season, guiding the French rookie through his debut year, including a podium finish at the 2025 Dutch Grand Prix. In 2026 he has been assigned as Race Engineer to another rookie, Arvid Lindblad, overseeing the Briton's transition into Formula One.
