= Buc =

Buc may refer to:

- Buc, Yvelines, a municipality in the Yvelines department, France
- Buc, Territoire de Belfort, a municipality in the Territoire de Belfort department, France
- Búč, a village in south Slovakia
- buc, the ISO 639-3 code for the Bushi language
- Buc, a nickname for the Bucciali, a French 1920s automobile

The abbreviation BUC may refer to:

- Burketown Airport
- Barcelona Universitari Club, a rugby club based in Barcelona
- BUC (rugby league team), a Catalonia rugby league team
- Bulgarian Air Charter, a charter airline based in Sofia, Bulgaria
- Block upconverter, a device used in the transmission of satellite signals
- Bergen University College, a higher education institute in Bergen, Norway
- Bàng-uâ-cê, the Foochow Romanized writing system of Fuzhou Mindong Chinese
- Beirut University College, old name for the Lebanese American University
- Badr University in Cairo, a private university in Egypt
- Business Use Case, a use case in software and systems engineering
