= University of Technology Tarbes Occitanie Pyrénées =

Public university of technology in Tarbes, France

Coordinates: 43.226°N 0.050°E

- Université de technologie Tarbes Occitanie Pyrénées
- Other names: UTTOP
- Type: Public
- Established: 2024
- Students: ~3,000
- Location: Tarbes, Occitanie, France
- Campus: Urban
- Website: www.uttop.fr

The University of Technology Tarbes Occitanie Pyrénées (French: Université de technologie Tarbes Occitanie Pyrénées UTTOP) is a public university of technology located in Tarbes, France. Established officially on 1 January 2024, UTTOP was formed by merging the École nationale d'ingénieurs de Tarbes (ENIT) and the Institut universitaire de technologie (IUT) of Tarbes. It is part of France's national network of technology universities, joining institutions in Compiègne (UTC), Troyes (UTT), and Belfort-Montbéliard (UTBM).

== History ==
The establishment of UTTOP was officially decreed on 24 November 2023, with the university commencing operations on 1 January 2024. The initiative, supported by regional and national authorities, aimed to consolidate and enhance engineering and technology education within the Hautes-Pyrénées region. Initial investments totaled approximately €50 million, marking significant advancement in local higher education and research capabilities.

In early 2025, the group of Universities of Technology in France signed a charter reaffirming their shared values, which included formally welcoming UTTOP as a new member of the network.

== Organization and Structure ==
UTTOP is structured around two main academic units:

- École nationale d'ingénieurs de Tarbes (ENIT), founded in 1963, offers engineering degrees accredited by the Commission des titres d'ingénieur (CTI).
- Institut universitaire de technologie de Tarbes (IUT de Tarbes), founded in 1993, provides bachelor's degrees in technology (BUT) and professional licenses in fields such as mechanical engineering, electrical engineering, civil engineering, multimedia, and business.

In April 2024, Marie-Laetitia Pastor was appointed director of IUT Tarbes, ahead of its integration into UTTOP.

The university specializes in engineering and technology fields, offering a range of programs from undergraduate to doctoral levels. UTTOP maintains strong connections with industries and enterprises in the region, particularly in sectors such as aerospace, energy, and digital technology.

== Academic Programs ==
UTTOP offers a variety of undergraduate, graduate, and doctoral programs focused on technology and engineering. Curricula emphasize practical experience, innovation, and collaboration with local industry sectors including aerospace, renewable energy, and digital technology.

As part of the Association of University Institutes of Technology (ARIUT), UTTOP actively engages in nationwide cooperation in technological education.

== Campus and Facilities ==
Located in the city of Tarbes, UTTOP's campus is characterized as urban and conducive to focused academic work and vibrant student life, benefiting from its proximity to the Pyrenees.

The university's facilities include modern laboratories, research centers, and collaborative spaces designed to foster innovation and interdisciplinary projects.

== International Partnerships ==
UTTOP maintains international collaborations including partnerships with institutions such as the University of Mahajanga in Madagascar, fostering academic exchanges and joint research initiatives.

The university is actively working to expand its international network and develop new collaborative programs with partner institutions across Europe and beyond.

== See also ==
- List of universities in France
- Education in France
