= Charmois, Territoire de Belfort =

Charmois
- Commune
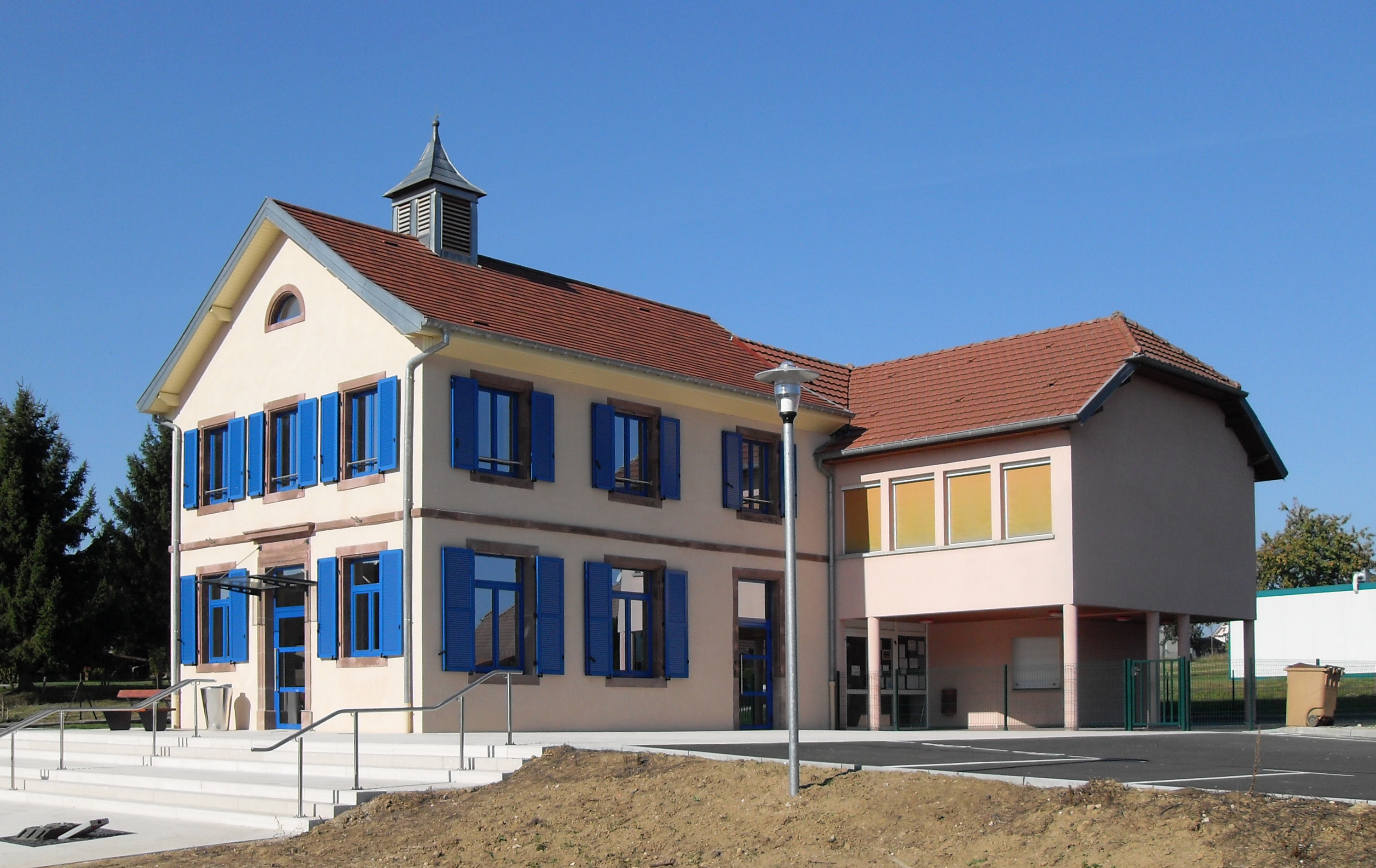
- Town hall-school

- Coat of arms
- Location of Charmois
- Location within France Location within Bourgogne-Franche-Comté
- Coordinates: 47°34′29″N 6°56′19″E
- Country: France
- Region: Bourgogne-Franche-Comté
- Department: Territoire de Belfort
- Arrondissement: Belfort
- Canton: Châtenois-les-Forges
- Intercommunality: Grand Belfort

Government
  - Mayor (2020–2026): Julien Plumeleur
- Area^{1}: 4.17 km^{2} (1.61 sq mi)
- Highest elevation: 371 m (1,217 ft)
- Lowest elevation: 330 m (1,080 ft)
- Population (2023): 369
  - Density: 88.5/km^{2} (229/sq mi)
- Time zone: UTC+01:00 (CET)
  - Summer (DST): UTC+02:00 (CEST)
- INSEE/Postal code: 90021 /90140
- ^{1} French Land Register data, which excludes lakes, ponds, glaciers > 1 km^{2} (0.386 sq mi or 247 acres) and river estuaries.

Charmois (French pronunciation: [ʃaʁmwa]) is a commune in the Territoire de Belfort department in Bourgogne-Franche-Comté in northeastern France.

The inhabitants of the town of Charmois are called Charmoyens, Charmoyennes in French.

== Population ==
Historical population
Year	Pop.	±% p.a.
1968	121	—
1975	115	−0.72%
1982	203	+8.46%
1990	227	+1.41%
1999	261	+1.56%
2007	289	+1.28%
2012	293	+0.28%
2017	340	+3.02%
2023	369	+1.37%
Source: INSEE

== See also ==
- Communes of the Territoire de Belfort department
