= Trévenans =

- Commune
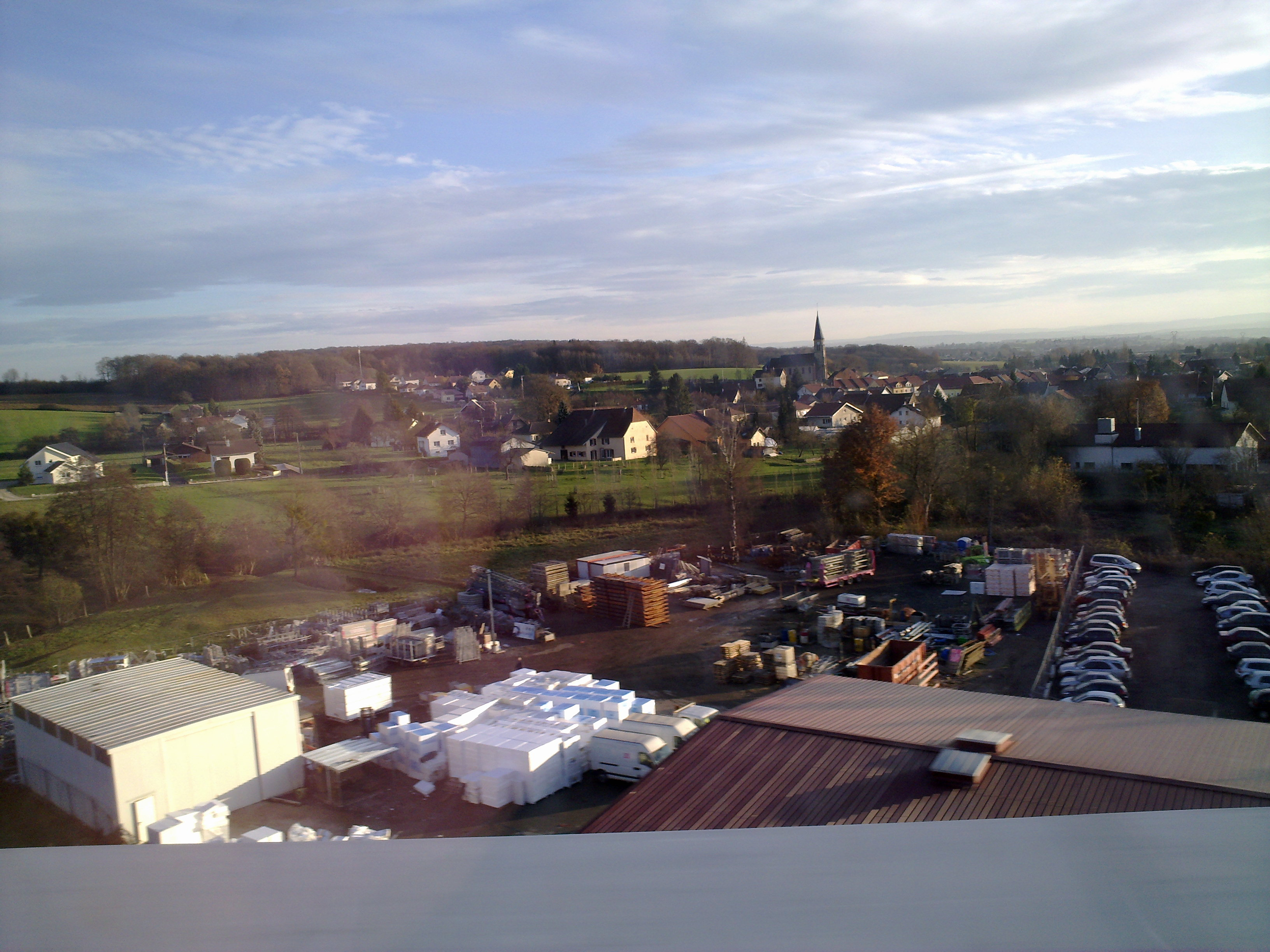
- Trévenans from the TGV
- Location of Trévenans
- Location within France Location within Bourgogne-Franche-Comté
- Coordinates: 47°34′15″N 6°51′43″E
- Country: France
- Region: Bourgogne-Franche-Comté
- Department: Territoire de Belfort
- Arrondissement: Belfort
- Canton: Châtenois-les-Forges
- Intercommunality: Grand Belfort

Government
  - Mayor (2020–2026): Pierre Barlogis
- Area^{1}: 5.96 km^{2} (2.30 sq mi)
- Highest elevation: 422 m (1,385 ft)
- Lowest elevation: 327 m (1,073 ft)
- Population (2023): 1,310
  - Density: 220/km^{2} (569/sq mi)
- Time zone: UTC+01:00 (CET)
  - Summer (DST): UTC+02:00 (CEST)
- INSEE/Postal code: 90097 /90400
- ^{1} French Land Register data, which excludes lakes, ponds, glaciers > 1 km^{2} (0.386 sq mi or 247 acres) and river estuaries.

Trévenans (French pronunciation: [tʁevnɑ̃]) is a commune in the Territoire de Belfort department in Bourgogne-Franche-Comté in northeastern France.

== See also ==
- Communes of the Territoire de Belfort department
