= Argiésans =

- Commune
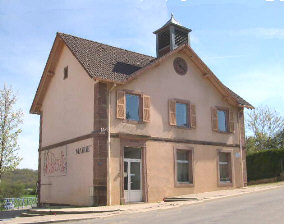
- Town hall

- Coat of arms
- Location of Argiésans
- Location within France Location within Bourgogne-Franche-Comté
- Coordinates: 47°36′17″N 6°49′25″E
- Country: France
- Region: Bourgogne-Franche-Comté
- Department: Territoire de Belfort
- Arrondissement: Belfort
- Canton: Châtenois-les-Forges
- Intercommunality: Grand Belfort

Government
  - Mayor (2020–2026): Roger Lauquin
- Area^{1}: 2.73 km^{2} (1.05 sq mi)
- Highest elevation: 440 m (1,440 ft)
- Lowest elevation: 342 m (1,122 ft)
- Population (2023): 607
  - Density: 222/km^{2} (576/sq mi)
- Time zone: UTC+01:00 (CET)
  - Summer (DST): UTC+02:00 (CEST)
- INSEE/Postal code: 90004 /90800
- ^{1} French Land Register data, which excludes lakes, ponds, glaciers > 1 km^{2} (0.386 sq mi or 247 acres) and river estuaries.

Argiésans (French pronunciation: [aʁʒjezɑ̃]) is a commune in the Territoire de Belfort department in Bourgogne-Franche-Comté in northeastern France.

== See also ==
- Communes of the Territoire de Belfort department
