= Banvillars =

- Commune
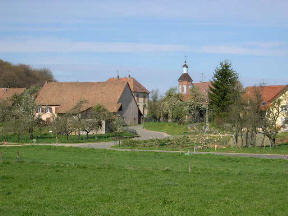
- Overview

- Coat of arms
- Location of Banvillars
- Location within France Location within Bourgogne-Franche-Comté
- Coordinates: 47°35′34″N 6°48′56″E
- Country: France
- Region: Bourgogne-Franche-Comté
- Department: Territoire de Belfort
- Arrondissement: Belfort
- Canton: Châtenois-les-Forges
- Intercommunality: Grand Belfort

Government
  - Mayor (2020–2026): Thierry Patte
- Area^{1}: 4.67 km^{2} (1.80 sq mi)
- Highest elevation: 444 m (1,457 ft)
- Lowest elevation: 348 m (1,142 ft)
- Population (2023): 289
  - Density: 61.9/km^{2} (160/sq mi)
- Time zone: UTC+01:00 (CET)
  - Summer (DST): UTC+02:00 (CEST)
- INSEE/Postal code: 90007 /90800
- Website: banvillars.com
- ^{1} French Land Register data, which excludes lakes, ponds, glaciers > 1 km^{2} (0.386 sq mi or 247 acres) and river estuaries.

Banvillars (French pronunciation: [bɑ̃vilaʁ]) is a commune in the Territoire de Belfort department in Bourgogne-Franche-Comté in northeastern France.

== See also ==
- Communes of the Territoire de Belfort department
