= Canton of Châtenois-les-Forges =

Coordinates: 47.56°N 6.85°E

- Canton
- Situation of the canton of Châtenois-les-Forges in the department of Territoire de Belfort
- Country: France
- Region: Bourgogne-Franche-Comté
- Department: Territoire de Belfort
- No. of communes: {{{nbcomm}}}
- Population (2023): 14,645
- INSEE code: 9005

The canton of Châtenois-les-Forges is an administrative division of the Territoire de Belfort department, northeastern France. Its borders were modified at the French canton reorganisation which came into effect in March 2015. Its seat is in Châtenois-les-Forges.

It consists of the following communes:

1. Andelnans
2. Argiésans
3. Banvillars
4. Bermont
5. Botans
6. Bourogne
7. Buc
8. Charmois
9. Châtenois-les-Forges
10. Chèvremont
11. Dorans
12. Meroux-Moval
13. Sevenans
14. Trévenans
15. Urcerey
16. Vézelois
