= Sevenans =

- Commune
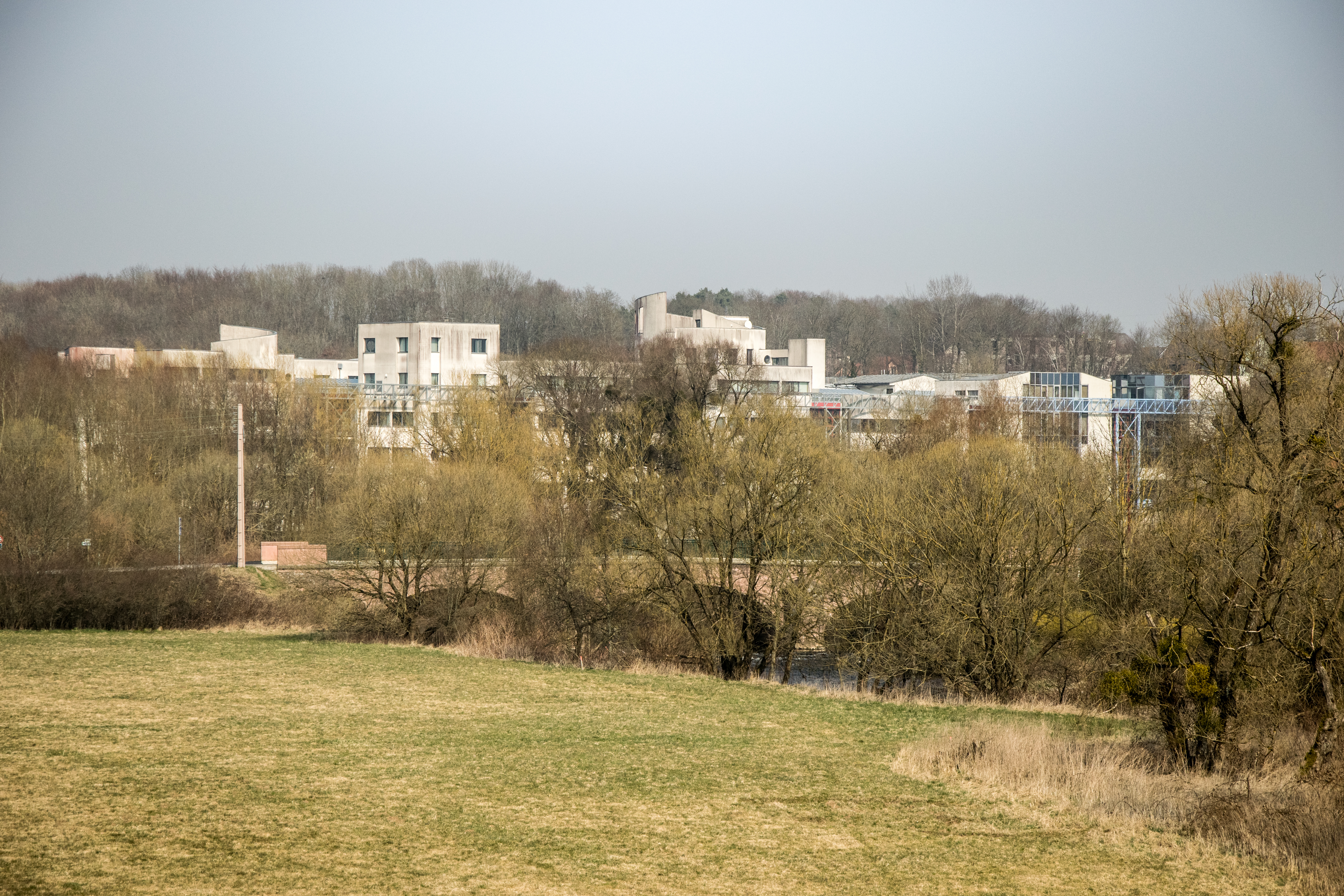
- The bridge over the Savoureuse river, with the UTBM university in the background.

- Coat of arms
- Location of Sevenans
- Location within France Location within Bourgogne-Franche-Comté
- Coordinates: 47°35′10″N 6°51′57″E
- Country: France
- Region: Bourgogne-Franche-Comté
- Department: Territoire de Belfort
- Arrondissement: Belfort
- Canton: Châtenois-les-Forges
- Intercommunality: Grand Belfort

Government
  - Mayor (2020–2026): Maryline Morallet
- Area^{1}: 2.02 km^{2} (0.78 sq mi)
- Highest elevation: 372 m (1,220 ft)
- Lowest elevation: 337 m (1,106 ft)
- Population (2023): 688
  - Density: 341/km^{2} (882/sq mi)
- Time zone: UTC+01:00 (CET)
  - Summer (DST): UTC+02:00 (CEST)
- INSEE/Postal code: 90094 /90400
- ^{1} French Land Register data, which excludes lakes, ponds, glaciers > 1 km^{2} (0.386 sq mi or 247 acres) and river estuaries.

Sevenans (French pronunciation: [sɛvnɑ̃]) is a commune in the Territoire de Belfort department in Bourgogne-Franche-Comté in northeastern France.

== See also ==
- Communes of the Territoire de Belfort department
