= Andelnans =

- Commune
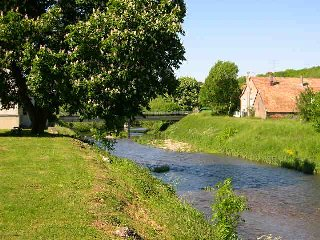
- River La Savoureuse

- Coat of arms
- Location of Andelnans
- Location within France Location within Bourgogne-Franche-Comté
- Coordinates: 47°36′11″N 6°52′10″E
- Country: France
- Region: Bourgogne-Franche-Comté
- Department: Territoire de Belfort
- Arrondissement: Belfort
- Canton: Châtenois-les-Forges
- Intercommunality: Grand Belfort

Government
  - Mayor (2020–2026): Bernard Mauffrey
- Area^{1}: 4.17 km^{2} (1.61 sq mi)
- Highest elevation: 407 m (1,335 ft)
- Lowest elevation: 340 m (1,120 ft)
- Population (2023): 1,093
  - Density: 262/km^{2} (679/sq mi)
- Time zone: UTC+01:00 (CET)
  - Summer (DST): UTC+02:00 (CEST)
- INSEE/Postal code: 90001 /90400
- ^{1} French Land Register data, which excludes lakes, ponds, glaciers > 1 km^{2} (0.386 sq mi or 247 acres) and river estuaries.

Andelnans (French pronunciation: [ɑ̃dɛlnɑ̃]) is a commune in the Territoire de Belfort department in Bourgogne-Franche-Comté in northeastern France.

== See also ==
- Communes of the Territoire de Belfort department
