= Malplaquet proclamation =

1815 proclamation of goodwill to the French

The Malplaquet proclamation was issued by Arthur Wellesley, 1st Duke of Wellington, commander of the Anglo-allied army on 22 June 1815. It announced to the French people that Wellington's army was there to restore their rightful king (Louis XVIII) and the government that had been usurped by Napoleon Bonaparte on his return from the island of Elba; and that their lives and their property rights would be honoured.

== Prelude ==
In response to Napoleon Bonaparte leaving Elba and landing in France on 13 March 1815, the Seventh Coalition powers meeting at the Congress of Vienna declared Napoleon Bonaparte an outlaw and that they would render "all the assistance requisite to restore public tranquillity" to the French King and nation.

After the Seventh Coalition's victory at the Battle of Waterloo on 18 June 1815, the Anglo-allied army under the command of Wellington and a Prussian army under the command of Prince Blücher followed up the general French retreat and crossed the frontier into France, intending to march on Paris. Although they marched close enough to come to each other's aid if needed, the commanders chose slightly different axes of advance.

At daybreak on 19 June, the portion of Wellington's army that had fought the Battle of Waterloo broke up from its bivouac, and began to move along the high road to Nivelles. Those troops which had been posted in front of Hal during 18 June, were likewise directed to march upon Nivelles. Wellington's army occupied Nivelles and the surrounding villages during the night of 19 June; in the course of which the Duke arrived from Brussels, and established his headquarters in the town. It was there that he issued a general order to his army. In the general order he made it clear to those under his command:

that their respective Sovereigns are the Allies of His Majesty the King of France; and that France ought, therefore, to be treated as a friendly country. It is therefore required that nothing should be taken, either by officers or soldiers, for which payment is not made.

— Wellington, at Nevilles (20 June 1815).

The Anglo-Allied Army marched on 20 June to Binche and Mons with the cavalry screen fanning out to cover the van and flanks of the army. Wellington established his headquarters at Binche. On 21 June, Wellington crossed the French frontier, moving the principal portion of his army to Bavay, and the remainder from Mons upon Valenciennes, which fortress was immediately blockaded; and established his headquarters at Malplaquet, on site of the Battle of Malplaquet where the Duke of Marlborough and Prince Eugene of Savoy had won a famous victory against the French a century before.

== Proclamation ==
At Malplaquet, Wellington issued a proclamation to the French people that Napoleon Bonaparte was an usurper and that his army came as liberators, not as enemy invaders; and that he had issued orders to his army that all French citizens who did not oppose his army would be treated fairly and with respect.

In contrast, no proclamation of a similar nature was issued by Prince Blücher, commander of the Prussian army, nor were any direct orders given by the latter to remind his troops that France was "to be treated as a friendly country", or to forbid them taking anything "for which payment be not made".

In the opinion of Siborne and Gifford:

hence, in the advance to Paris, a marked contrast was observed between the conduct of the Prussian, and that of the Anglo-Allied, Army: the troops of the former committing great excesses and imposing severe exactions along their whole line of march; (Note: One British officer, Percy Hamilton, related: But albeit we met no enemy to molest us on our route, we witnessed scenes of deadly havoc and devastation which made us feel acutely for the sufferings of the hapless rural population, the unsophisticated cultivators of the soil. In many a direction villages and hamlets were depopulated, fertile farms laid waste; the former occupants had abandoned their happy rustic homes at the approach of the Prussian troops, who, still smarting under their defeat at Jena, and remembering the treatment of their countrymen by Napoleon's army, wreaked their vengeance upon the unoffending inhabitants by deeds of licentious wickedness, lawless passion, incendiarism, and unprovoked revenge. Let us hope that the miscreants I allude to were exceptions to the general rule, and that the body of brave soldiers who had fought under their gallant veteran chief, Blucher, did not sully their fair fame or tarnish their well earned laurels by deeds of spoil and villany.)

Meanwhile, the British, Dutch, and German troops under the Duke of Wellington acquired from the outset the goodwill and kindly disposition of the inhabitants of the country through which they passed. The Anglo-Allied troops inspired the people with confidence: the Prussians awed them into subjection. (Note: "The greatest excesses were committed by the Prussian soldiery, when they entered [Avesnes], which instead of being restrained was encouraged by their officers" .)

Much of the cause of all this may be traced to the different views entertained by the two great Commanders. Blücher's extreme hatred of the French would not allow him to modify, still less to abandon, the opinion which he had imbibed from the first moment he heard of the escape of Napoleon from Elba; that they ought not only to be thoroughly humbled, but also severely punished. Neither he nor his soldiers could ever forget the cruelties and extortions which their own country had been compelled to endure when overrun by the French: and now that they were once more brought into the land of their enemies, and another period of retribution had arrived; but one sentiment pervaded the whole Prussian Army — that those who had not scrupled to inflict the scourge of war throughout the whole continent, should, in their turn, be made duly sensible of its evils. In Siborne's opinion a contrary train of ideas, or a different course of proceeding, on the part of the Prussians was scarcely to be expected. Hence the value of the excellent and orderly conduct of the British troops operating as a salutary counterpoise to the domineering and revengeful spirit which actuated the Prussians.

Blücher felt equally with Wellington that the advance upon Paris before the approach of the other allied armies, which were then only crossing the Rhine, was a departure from strictly military principles; and that this could only be justified by the extraordinary moral effect which would be produced by the signal defeat of Napoleon. But his views were limited to the military part of the plan, which was to make a dash at the capital; and, if possible, to intercept Marshal Grouchy and his still intact and undefeated wing of the Army of the North, whilst endeavouring to rejoin the routed force under Marshal Soult.

Wellington's policy embraced a wider field. He invariably kept in view the great object for which the war had been undertaken. The information which he contrived to obtain relative to the effect which Napoleon's disaster produced upon the minds of the leading men of the great political parties by which France was then agitated, and upon the Members of the two Chambers of Parliament generally, combined with the knowledge he had already acquired of the disposition of the inhabitants of the Department of the North, which, in fact, had not evinced that enthusiasm attendant upon the return of Napoleon from Elba that was manifested throughout the greater part of the nation, convinced him that by adopting measures calculated to impress upon the French people that the allies were friendly towards them, though inveterately hostile to Napoleon, and by seizing every advantage afforded by the presence and the influence of their legitimate monarch, he was, by such means, ensuring the security of the operations upon Paris more effectively than could have been accomplished by additional military force applied under different circumstances.

The aid which such a line of conduct, on the part of Wellington, gave to the cause of Louis XVIII was immense. The people of the Northern Departments, who, in general, were wearied by the continuance of wars; and who now longed to enjoy the blessings of peace, saw in the friendly disposition of the allies, and the support which these yielded to the King's authority, a pledge of their determination to crush the war party, and at the same time, to cement their alliance with the legitimate sovereign. White flags were soon seen to wave from countless steeples. The tide of Royalty, favoured in no small degree by the versatile nature of a population now familiar changing regimes, was already setting in fast: and as it rolled steadily on towards the capital, Wellington's foresight and good tact gave it an impulse which not only bore him along with it in easy triumph, but; when it subsequently reached the goal, swept away every vestige of the government that supported Napoleon and his adherents.
