= Jean-Baptiste Waldner =

French engineer

- Born: 30 March 1959 (age 67)
- Education: École Supérieure d'Électricité; Institut National des Sciences et Techniques Nucléaires
- Occupations: engineer management consultant author

Jean-Baptiste Waldner (born 30 March 1959) is a French engineer, management consultant and author, known for his contributions in the fields of computer-integrated manufacturing, enterprise architecture, nanoelectronics, nanocomputers and swarm intelligence.

== Biography ==
Waldner received his engineering degree in mechanical engineering from the Université de technologie de Belfort-Montbéliard in 1983, his Dr Engineer in Electronics in 1986 from the École Supérieure d'Électricité, and his doctoral engineering degree in nuclear science and engineering in 1986 from the Institut National des Sciences et Techniques Nucléaires.

In 1986 Waldner started as consultant for the French Information Technology and Services company Bull, where he specialized in Computer Integrated Manufacturing. From 1990 to 1993 he was senior manager at Deloitte, senior partner at Computer Sciences Corporation from 1993 to 1996, Program Director for IT and Shared Services Centers at Carrefour from 1999 to 2001, and co-founded his own management consulting firm Waldner Consulting in 2004.

== Work ==
Waldner's research interests ranges from Manufacturing Resource, Planning Computer Integrated Manufacturing and Enterprise Architecture, to Nanoelectronics and Nanocomputers.

=== Manufacturing Resource Planning (MRP/MRP2) ===
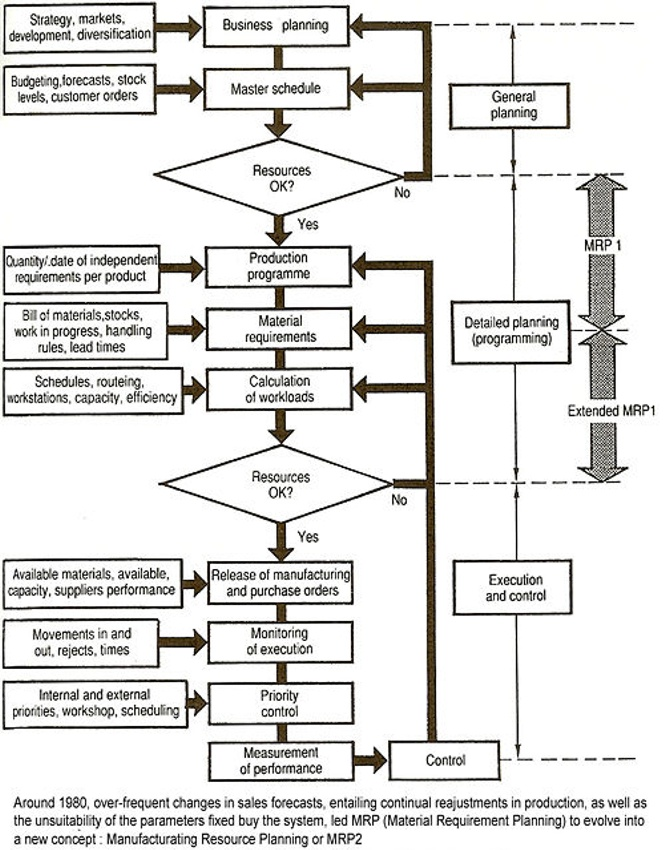
Manufacturing Resource Planning (or MRP2) - Around 1980

The Manufacturing Resource Planning concept has evolved over the past 30 years from a simple means of calculating materials requirements and components (which does not even take into account the production capacity of the company) - to integrated ERP MRP concepts and software to automated management of the entire company.

During the 1980s the increasing changes of sales forecasts, which resulted in continuous and manual adjustments of the production plan, has in led to the MRP (Material Requirement Planning) model, which was strictly limited to the supply of materials. Eventually this evolved in means for wider production resources management, MRP2 (Manufacturing Resources Planning).

Waldner (1992) showed, that MRP and MRP2 are essential principles of Computer Integrated Manufacturing (CIM). In the planning process of the enterprise they are the essential link between General Planning and execution and control. Thereby MRP2 covers three phases (see image):

- Production programme
- Material requirements,
- Calculation of workload

According to Oliveira (2003) the work of Waldner (1992) and others became "an important effort towards the goal of increasing the competitiveness of manufacturing companies through the introduction of automation and wider use of computers."

=== Computer Integrated Manufacturing ===
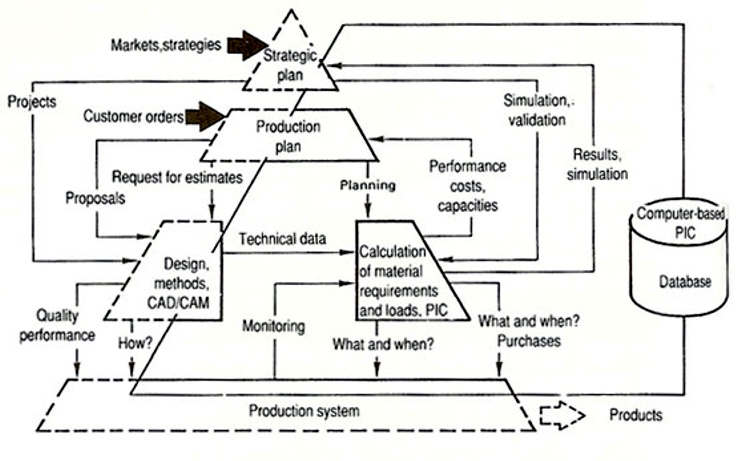
Computer Integrated Manufacturing control system

According to Waldner (1992) Computer Integrated Manufacturing is used to describe the complete automation of a manufacturing plant, with all processes running under computer control and digital information tying them together. There are three major challenges to development of a smoothly operating computer-integrated manufacturing system:

- Integration of components from different suppliers: When different machines, such as CNC, conveyors and robots, are using different communications protocols (In the case of AGVs, even differing lengths of time for charging the batteries) may cause problems.
- Data integrity: The higher the degree of automation, the more critical is the integrity of the data used to control the machines. While the computer integrated manufacturing system saves on labor of operating the machines, it requires extra human labor in ensuring that there are proper safeguards for the data signals that are used to control the machines.
- Process control: Computers may be used to assist the human operators of the manufacturing facility, but there must always be a competent engineer on hand to handle circumstances which could not be foreseen by the designers of the control software.

Machado et al. (2000) explained that "control, monitoring and supervision of industrial processes are increasingly demanding a great investment in technological solutions each time more embedded and with real-time capabilities, especially devoted to the interconnect, in an intelligent way, of shop-floor equipment with operational information systems." This gave rise to a new type of so-called Control-based Information System, in which information in factory plants flow between the shopfloor and the upper Computer Integrated Manufacturing systems as Waldner (1992) stated.

=== Nanocomputers and swarm intelligence ===
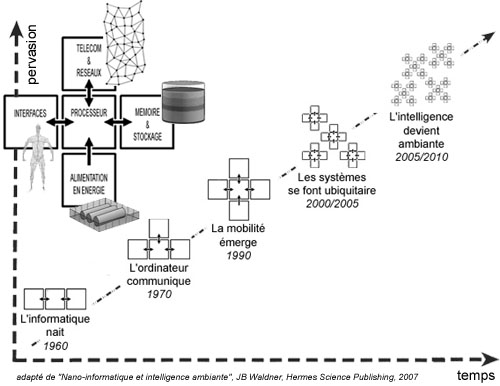
Evolution of the computer between the 1960s and 2010. This evolution is organized around five functional blocks: the processor, memory and mass storage devices, networks and telecommunications, power supply devices and the interfaces between the machine and the user or the machine and the environment

The author forecasts a fundamental technological disruption in the computer world in the years 2020–25 by considering the physical limit of the miniaturization of the components to the silicon and the fatality of the Moore's law. This phenomenon, combined with the demand for mobility, will transform the landscape of conventional computing bringing about the breakthrough that will enable a vast and heterogeneous network of objects that impose a new vision of the software (i.e. distributed intelligence with lighter/simpler software code at the unit level but introducing much more numerous agents). Computing system will evolve from a centralized or distributed model to swarm intelligence, self-organized systems in which nodes will count in billions. The author notes that a human being interacts with 1000 to 5000 objects in a typical day At maturity, connected devices and Internet of things market could range from a few tens of billions to several trillion units. In 2007, as an early pioneer, Waldner strongly believed that the Internet of Things was poised to deeply transform the supply chain and the logistics industry.

Waldner has a predominant interest in human–computer interaction (HCI) and considers that the evolution of computing machines and of the solutions they bring will rely fundamentally on the progress of these interfaces.

== Publications ==
Waldner has authored several books and articles. Books:

- CIM, les nouvelles perspectives de la production, Dunod-Bordas, 1990 ISBN 978-2-04-019820-6
- CIM: Principles of Computer-Integrated Manufacturing, John Wiley & Sons, 1992 ISBN 0-471-93450-X.
- Nano-informatique – Inventer l’ordinateur du XXIème Siècle, Hermès Science, London, 2007 ISBN 978-2-7462-1516-0
- Nanocomputers & Swarm Intelligence, ISTE, London, 2007 ISBN 978-1-84821-009-7
