= Châtenois-les-Forges =

- Commune
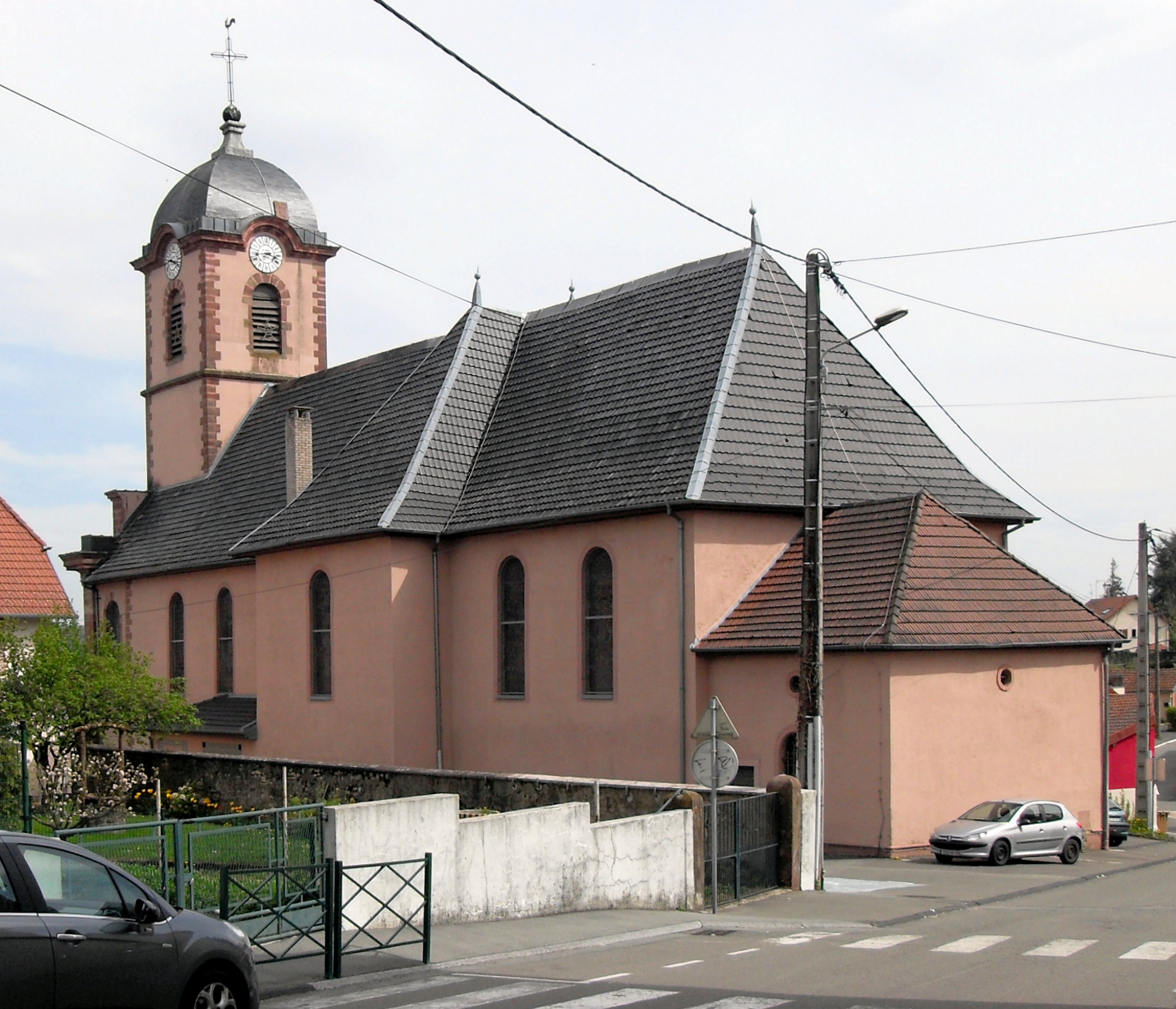
- Saint Étienne (Saint Stephen) church

- Coat of arms
- Location of Châtenois-les-Forges
- Location within France Location within Bourgogne-Franche-Comté
- Coordinates: 47°33′35″N 6°50′57″E
- Country: France
- Region: Bourgogne-Franche-Comté
- Department: Territoire de Belfort
- Arrondissement: Belfort
- Canton: Châtenois-les-Forges
- Intercommunality: Grand Belfort

Government
  - Mayor (2022–2026): Marie-Josée Baillif
- Area^{1}: 8.67 km^{2} (3.35 sq mi)
- Highest elevation: 415 m (1,362 ft)
- Lowest elevation: 328 m (1,076 ft)
- Population (2023): 2,608
  - Density: 301/km^{2} (779/sq mi)
- Time zone: UTC+01:00 (CET)
  - Summer (DST): UTC+02:00 (CEST)
- INSEE/Postal code: 90022 /90700
- ^{1} French Land Register data, which excludes lakes, ponds, glaciers > 1 km^{2} (0.386 sq mi or 247 acres) and river estuaries.

Châtenois-les-Forges (French pronunciation: [ʃatnwa le fɔʁʒ]; German: Kestenholz) is a commune in the Territoire de Belfort department in Bourgogne-Franche-Comté in northeastern France.

== Population ==
Historical population
Year	Pop.	±% p.a.
1968	2,468	—
1975	2,704	+1.31%
1982	2,691	−0.07%
1990	2,517	−0.83%
1999	2,680	+0.70%
2007	2,802	+0.56%
2012	2,724	−0.56%
2017	2,750	+0.19%
2023	2,608	−0.88%
Source: INSEE

== See also ==
- Communes of the Territoire de Belfort department
