= Buc, Territoire de Belfort =

Buc
- Commune
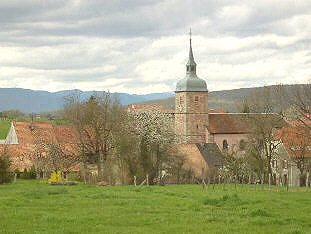
- The village and the church

- Coat of arms
- Location of Buc
- Location within France Location within Bourgogne-Franche-Comté
- Coordinates: 47°36′55″N 6°47′10″E
- Country: France
- Region: Bourgogne-Franche-Comté
- Department: Territoire de Belfort
- Arrondissement: Belfort
- Canton: Châtenois-les-Forges
- Intercommunality: Grand Belfort

Government
  - Mayor (2020–2026): Didier Sacksteder
- Area^{1}: 2.44 km^{2} (0.94 sq mi)
- Highest elevation: 461 m (1,512 ft)
- Lowest elevation: 364 m (1,194 ft)
- Population (2023): 244
  - Density: 100/km^{2} (259/sq mi)
- Time zone: UTC+01:00 (CET)
  - Summer (DST): UTC+02:00 (CEST)
- INSEE/Postal code: 90020 /90800
- ^{1} French Land Register data, which excludes lakes, ponds, glaciers > 1 km^{2} (0.386 sq mi or 247 acres) and river estuaries.

Buc (French pronunciation: [byk]) is a commune in the Territoire de Belfort department in Bourgogne-Franche-Comté in northeastern France.

== See also ==
- Communes of the Territoire de Belfort department
