= Chèvremont =

- Commune
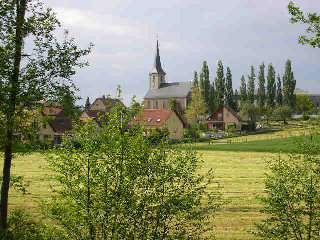
- The landscape of Chèvremont

- Coat of arms
- Location of Chèvremont
- Location within France Location within Bourgogne-Franche-Comté
- Coordinates: 47°37′47″N 6°55′26″E
- Country: France
- Region: Bourgogne-Franche-Comté
- Department: Territoire de Belfort
- Arrondissement: Belfort
- Canton: Châtenois-les-Forges
- Intercommunality: Grand Belfort

Government
  - Mayor (2020–2026): Jean-Paul Moutarlier
- Area^{1}: 8.83 km^{2} (3.41 sq mi)
- Highest elevation: 391 m (1,283 ft)
- Lowest elevation: 341 m (1,119 ft)
- Population (2023): 1,539
  - Density: 174/km^{2} (451/sq mi)
- Time zone: UTC+01:00 (CET)
  - Summer (DST): UTC+02:00 (CEST)
- INSEE/Postal code: 90026 /90340
- ^{1} French Land Register data, which excludes lakes, ponds, glaciers > 1 km^{2} (0.386 sq mi or 247 acres) and river estuaries.

Chèvremont (French pronunciation: [ʃɛvʁəmɔ̃]) is a commune in the Territoire de Belfort department in Bourgogne-Franche-Comté in northeastern France.

== See also ==
- Communes of the Territoire de Belfort department
