= Bourogne =

- Commune
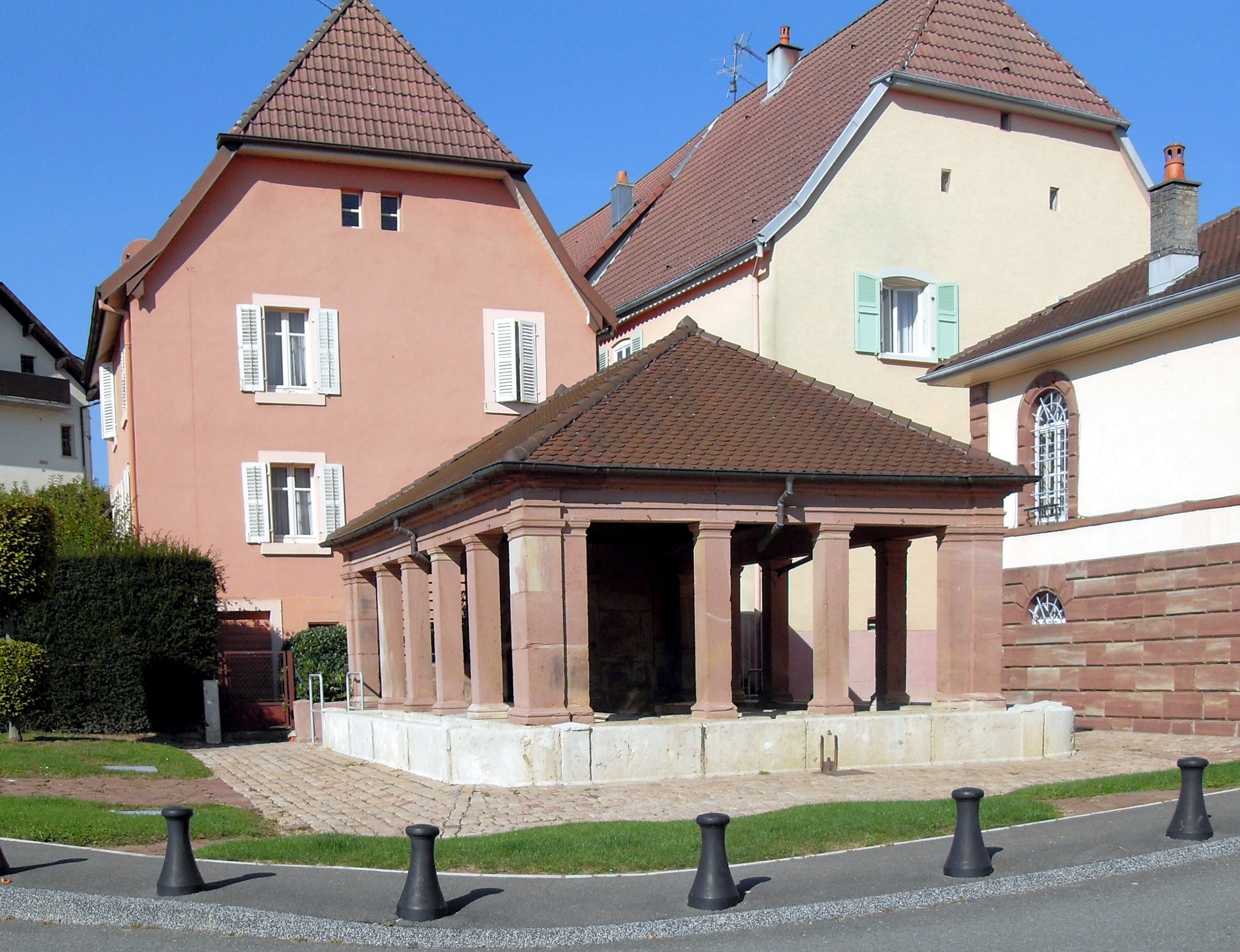
- Lavoir

- Coat of arms
- Location of Bourogne
- Location within France Location within Bourgogne-Franche-Comté
- Coordinates: 47°33′47″N 6°55′07″E
- Country: France
- Region: Bourgogne-Franche-Comté
- Department: Territoire de Belfort
- Arrondissement: Belfort
- Canton: Châtenois-les-Forges
- Intercommunality: Grand Belfort

Government
  - Mayor (2020–2026): Baptiste Guardia
- Area^{1}: 13.71 km^{2} (5.29 sq mi)
- Highest elevation: 427 m (1,401 ft)
- Lowest elevation: 327 m (1,073 ft)
- Population (2023): 1,741
  - Density: 127.0/km^{2} (328.9/sq mi)
- Time zone: UTC+01:00 (CET)
  - Summer (DST): UTC+02:00 (CEST)
- INSEE/Postal code: 90017 /90140
- ^{1} French Land Register data, which excludes lakes, ponds, glaciers > 1 km^{2} (0.386 sq mi or 247 acres) and river estuaries.

Bourogne (French pronunciation: [buʁɔɲ]; Frainc-Comtou: Borangne) is a commune in the Territoire de Belfort department in Bourgogne-Franche-Comté in northeastern France.

== See also ==
- Communes of the Territoire de Belfort department
