= Université de technologie de Belfort-Montbéliard =

French university of engineering in Franche-Comté

Coordinates: 47°35′17″N 6°51′57″E

University of Technology of Belfort-Montbéliard
- Université de Technologie de Belfort-Montbéliard
- Former names: École nationale d'ingénieurs de Belfort (ENIBe), institut polytechnique de Sevenans (IPSé)
- Type: Public
- Established: 1999; 27 years ago
- Endowment: €40,000,000 (overall budget)
- President: Abdelatif Miraoui
- Administrative staff: 416
- Undergraduates: 2,600
- Postgraduates: 300
- Location: Belfort, Sevenans, and Montbéliard, France
- Campus: Urban, 54,000 m^{2} (580,000 sq ft)
- Website: www.utbm.fr

The University of Technology of Belfort-Montbéliard (UTBM) is a Grande École university. of engineering located in Belfort, Sevenans and Montbéliard, France. The University of Technology of Belfort-Montbéliard is part of the network of the three universities of technology. Inspired by the American University of Pennsylvania in Philadelphia, these three universities (UTC, UTBM and UTT) are a French mixture between the universities of this country and its schools of engineers (Grandes écoles).

Their teaching model is a mix between the North-American model and the French traditions: courses choice, separation of the courses, tutorials / directed work (TDs) and labs / practical work (TPs). These three universities give an engineering degree equivalent to the Bac+5 formations of the French Grandes Ecoles.

== Alumni ==
UTBM alumni include: Jean-Baptiste Waldner

== See also ==
- Université de Technologie
- The University of Technology of Compiègne (Université de Technologie de Compiègne or UTC)
- The University of Technology of Troyes (Université de Technologie de Troyes or UTT)
