= Cantons of the Territoire de Belfort department =

The department of the Territoire de Belfort consists of 9 cantons since the cantonal redistribution of 2014 which came into effect in March 2015.

== Cantonal distribution of 1973 to 2014 ==
Between 1973 and 2014 the department of the Territoire de Belfort was divided into 15 cantons including the following:

- Canton of Beaucourt
- Canton of Belfort-Centre
- Canton of Belfort-Est
- Canton of Belfort-Nord
- Canton of Belfort-Ouest
- Canton of Belfort-Sud
- Canton of Châtenois-les-Forges
- Canton of Danjoutin
- Canton of Delle
- Canton of Fontaine
- Canton of Giromagny
- Canton of Grandvillars
- Canton of Offemont
- Canton of Rougemont-le-Château
- Canton of Valdoie

== Cantonal redistribution of 2014 ==
=== Detailed composition ===
#	Canton Name	Canton Seat	Population (2012)	Number of communes	Commune composition of the canton
1	Bavilliers	Bavilliers	14,732	5	Bavilliers, Cravanche, Danjoutin, Essert, Pérouse.
2	Belfort-1	Belfort	17,121	Fraction of Belfort	
3	Belfort-2	Belfort	17,745	Fraction of Belfort	
4	Belfort-3	Belfort	15,236	Fraction of Belfort	Part of the commune of Belfort not included in the cantons of Belfort-1 and Belfort-2.
5	Châtenois-les-Forges	Châtenois-les-Forges	14,296	16	Andelnans, Argiésans, Banvillars, Bermont, Botans, Bourogne, Buc, Charmois, Châtenois-les-Forges, Chèvremont, Dorans, Meroux-Moval, Sevenans, Trévenans, Urcerey, Vézelois.
6	Delle	Delle	17,582	16	Beaucourt, Courcelles, Courtelevant, Croix, Delle, Faverois, Fêche-l'Église, Florimont, Joncherey, Lebetain, Lepuix-Neuf, Montbouton, Réchésy, Saint-Dizier-l'Évêque, Thiancourt, Villars-le-Sec.
7	Giromagny	Giromagny	15,317	22	Anjoutey, Auxelles-Bas, Auxelles-Haut, Bourg-sous-Châtelet, Chaux, Étueffont, Felon, Giromagny, Grosmagny, Lachapelle-sous-Chaux, Lachapelle-sous-Rougemont, Lamadeleine-Val-des-Anges, Lepuix, Leval, Petitefontaine, Petitmagny, Riervescemont, Romagny-sous-Rougemont, Rougegoutte, Rougemont-le-Château, Saint-Germain-le-Châtelet, Vescemont.
8	Grandvillars	Grandvillars	16,868	33	Angeot, Autrechêne, Bessoncourt, Bethonvilliers, Boron, Brebotte, Bretagne, Chavanatte, Chavannes-les-Grands, Cunelières, Éguenigue, Fontaine, Fontenelle, Foussemagne, Frais, Froidefontaine, Grandvillars, Grosne, Lacollonge, Lagrange, Larivière, Menoncourt, Méziré, Montreux-Château, Morvillars, Novillard, Petit-Croix, Phaffans, Recouvrance, Reppe, Suarce, Vauthiermont, Vellescot.
9	Valdoie	Valdoie	15,043	8	Denney, Éloie, Évette-Salbert, Offemont, Roppe, Sermamagny, Valdoie, Vétrigne.
-			143,940	101	-
