= Lac de Malsaucy =

Lake in France

Lac du Malsaucy
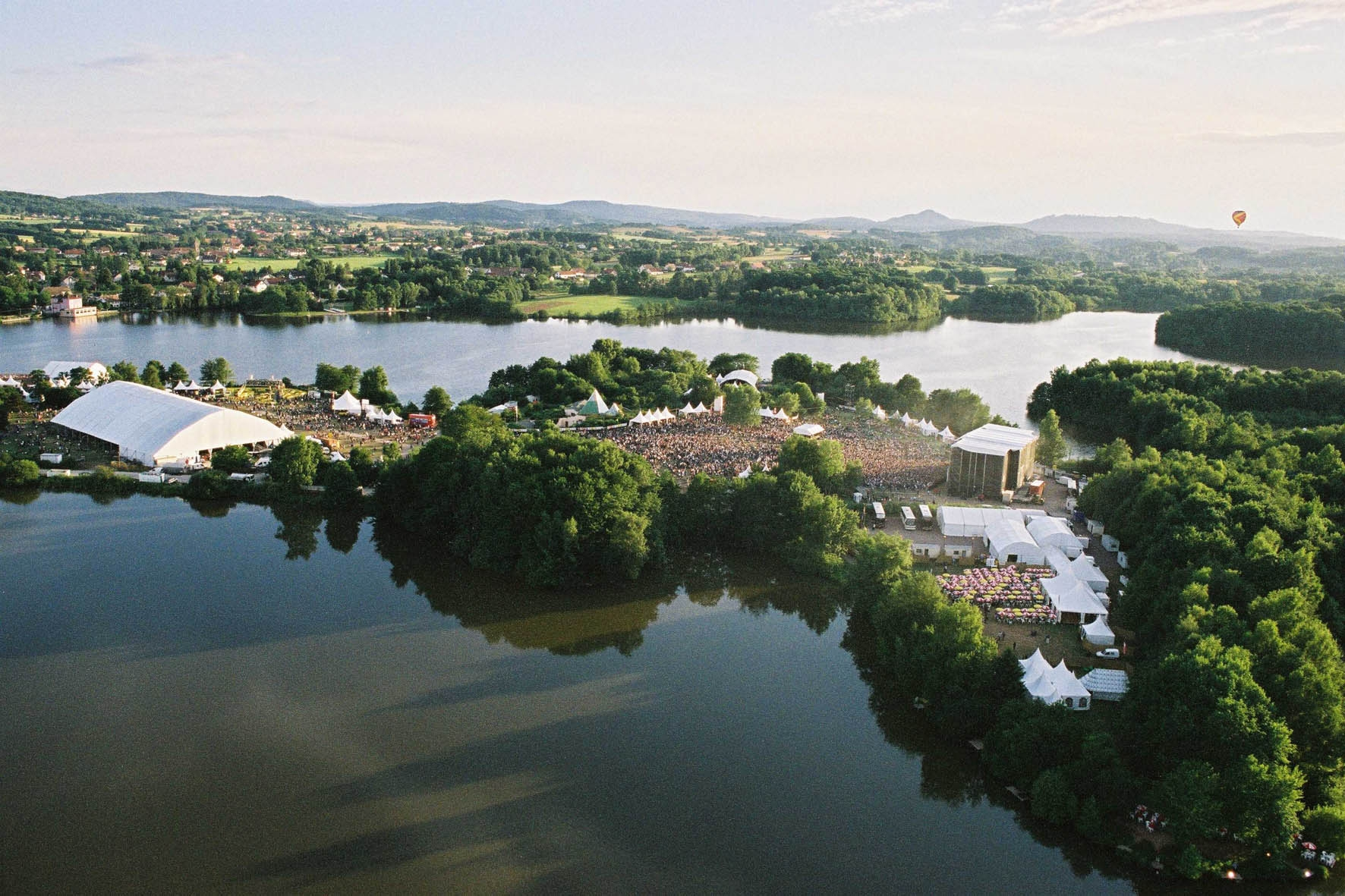
- Eurockéennes held in July at the lake

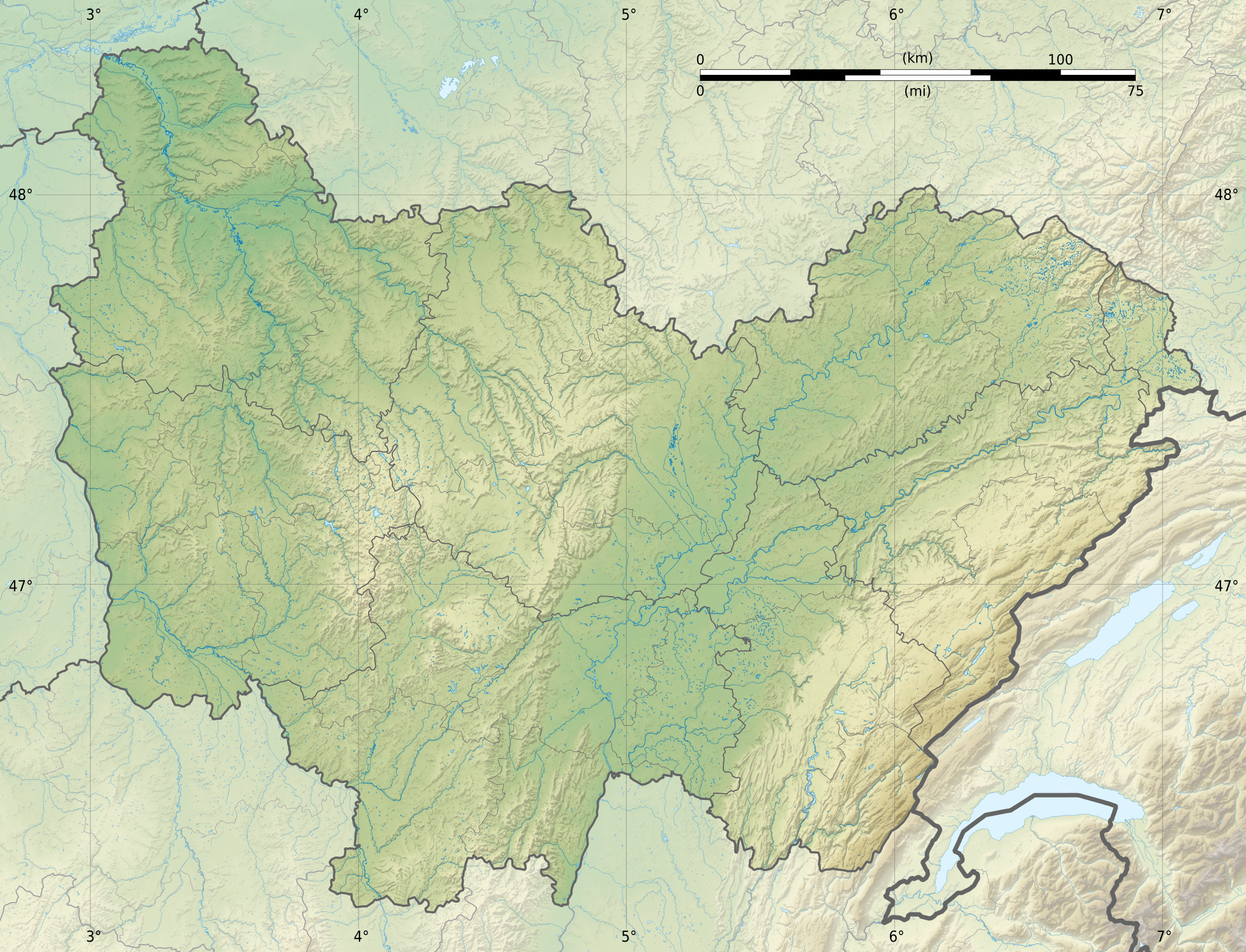
- Location within Bourgogne-Franche-Comté
- Location: Territoire de Belfort, Bourgogne-Franche-Comté
- Coordinates: 47°41′10″N 6°48′5″E
- Basin countries: France
- Max. length: 1.5 km (0.93 mi)
- Max. width: 0.5 km (0.31 mi)
- Surface area: 64 ha (160 acres)
- Max. depth: 27 meters (89 ft)

Lac de Malsaucy is a lake in the Territoire de Belfort, Franche-Comté, France. The lake with a surface of is 0.64 km^{2} shared by three communes: Evette-Salbert, Lachapelle-sous-Chaux and Sermamagny.

The rock festival Eurockéennes is held each July on an isthmus on the lake.
