= List of cantons of France =

The following is a list of cantons of France, within each department:

== Metropolitan France ==
Department		List of cantons
1	Ain	Cantons of the Ain department
2	Aisne	Cantons of the Aisne department
3	Allier	Cantons of the Allier department
4	Alpes-de-Haute-Provence	Cantons of the Alpes-de-Haute-Provence department
5	Hautes-Alpes	Cantons of the Hautes-Alpes department
6	Alpes-Maritimes	Cantons of the Alpes-Maritimes department
7	Ardèche	Cantons of the Ardèche department
8	Ardennes	Cantons of the Ardennes department
9	Ariège	Cantons of the Ariège department
10	Aube	Cantons of the Aube department
11	Aude	Cantons of the Aude department
12	Aveyron	Cantons of the Aveyron department
13	Bouches-du-Rhône	Cantons of the Bouches-du-Rhône department
14	Calvados	Cantons of the Calvados department
15	Cantal	Cantons of the Cantal department
16	Charente	Cantons of the Charente department
17	Charente-Maritime	Cantons of the Charente-Maritime department
18	Cher	Cantons of the Cher department
19	Corrèze	Cantons of the Corrèze department
2a	Corse-du-Sud	Cantons of the Corse-du-Sud department
2b	Haute-Corse	Cantons of the Haute-Corse department
21	Côte-d'Or	Cantons of the Côte-d'Or department
22	Côtes-d'Armor	Cantons of the Côtes-d'Armor department
23	Creuse	Cantons of the Creuse department
24	Dordogne	Cantons of the Dordogne department
25	Doubs	Cantons of the Doubs department
26	Drôme	Cantons of the Drôme department
27	Eure	Cantons of the Eure department
28	Eure-et-Loir	Cantons of the Eure-et-Loir department
29	Finistère	Cantons of the Finistère department
30	Gard	Cantons of the Gard department
31	Haute-Garonne	Cantons of the Haute-Garonne department
32	Gers	Cantons of the Gers department
33	Gironde	Cantons of the Gironde department
34	Hérault	Cantons of the Hérault department
35	Ille-et-Vilaine	Cantons of the Ille-et-Vilaine department
36	Indre	Cantons of the Indre department
37	Indre-et-Loire	Cantons of the Indre-et-Loire department
38	Isère	Cantons of the Isère department
39	Jura	Cantons of the Jura department
40	Landes	Cantons of the Landes department
41	Loir-et-Cher	Cantons of the Loir-et-Cher department
42	Loire	Cantons of the Loire department
43	Haute-Loire	Cantons of the Haute-Loire department
44	Loire-Atlantique	Cantons of the Loire-Atlantique department
45	Loiret	Cantons of the Loiret department
46	Lot	Cantons of the Lot department
47	Lot-et-Garonne	Cantons of the Lot-et-Garonne department
48	Lozère	Cantons of the Lozère department
49	Maine-et-Loire	Cantons of the Maine-et-Loire department
50	Manche	Cantons of the Manche department
51	Marne	Cantons of the Marne department
52	Haute-Marne	Cantons of the Haute-Marne department
53	Mayenne	Cantons of the Mayenne department
54	Meurthe-et-Moselle	Cantons of the Meurthe-et-Moselle department
55	Meuse	Cantons of the Meuse department
56	Morbihan	Cantons of the Morbihan department
57	Moselle	Cantons of the Moselle department
58	Nièvre	Cantons of the Nièvre department
59	Nord	Cantons of the Nord department
60	Oise	Cantons of the Oise department
61	Orne	Cantons of the Orne department
62	Pas-de-Calais	Cantons of the Pas-de-Calais department
63	Puy-de-Dôme	Cantons of the Puy-de-Dôme department
64	Pyrénées-Atlantiques	Cantons of the Pyrénées-Atlantiques department
65	Hautes-Pyrénées	Cantons of the Hautes-Pyrénées department
66	Pyrénées-Orientales	Cantons of the Pyrénées-Orientales department
67	Bas-Rhin	Cantons of the Bas-Rhin department
68	Haut-Rhin	Cantons of the Haut-Rhin department
69	Rhône	Cantons of the Rhône department
70	Haute-Saône	Cantons of the Haute-Saône department
71	Saône-et-Loire	Cantons of the Saône-et-Loire department
72	Sarthe	Cantons of the Sarthe department
73	Savoie	Cantons of the Savoie department
74	Haute-Savoie	Cantons of the Haute-Savoie department
75	Paris	Arrondissements of Paris
76	Seine-Maritime	Cantons of the Seine-Maritime department
77	Seine-et-Marne	Cantons of the Seine-et-Marne department
78	Yvelines	Cantons of the Yvelines department
79	Deux-Sèvres	Cantons of the Deux-Sèvres department
80	Somme	Cantons of the Somme department
81	Tarn	Cantons of the Tarn department
82	Tarn-et-Garonne	Cantons of the Tarn-et-Garonne department
83	Var	Cantons of the Var department
84	Vaucluse	Cantons of the Vaucluse department
85	Vendée	Cantons of the Vendée department
86	Vienne	Cantons of the Vienne department
87	Haute-Vienne	Cantons of the Haute-Vienne department
88	Vosges	Cantons of the Vosges department
89	Yonne	Cantons of the Yonne department
90	Territoire de Belfort	Cantons of the Territoire de Belfort department
91	Essonne	Cantons of the Essonne department
92	Hauts-de-Seine	Cantons of the Hauts-de-Seine department
93	Seine-Saint-Denis	Cantons of the Seine-Saint-Denis department
94	Val-de-Marne	Cantons of the Val-de-Marne department
95	Val-d'Oise	Cantons of the Val-d'Oise department

== French overseas departments and territories ==
Department		List of cantons
971	Guadeloupe	Cantons of the Guadeloupe department
972	Martinique	Cantons of the Martinique department
973	Guyane	Cantons of the Guyane department
974	Réunion	Cantons of the Réunion department
976	Mayotte	Cantons of the Mayotte department

== See also ==
- List of former cantons of France
