= Pérouse =

Pérouse may refer to:

- Pérouse, Territoire de Belfort, a commune of the Franche-Comté region of France
- Perugia, a city in Italy, known as Pérouse in French
- Perouse (part of Rutesheim), a German municipality of Waldensian descent

== See also ==
- Jean-François de Galaup, comte de La Pérouse
  - La Pérouse Strait, a strait between Sakhalin and Hokkaido
- La Perouse, New South Wales, a suburb of Sydney, Australia
