= Saype =

Contemporary artist

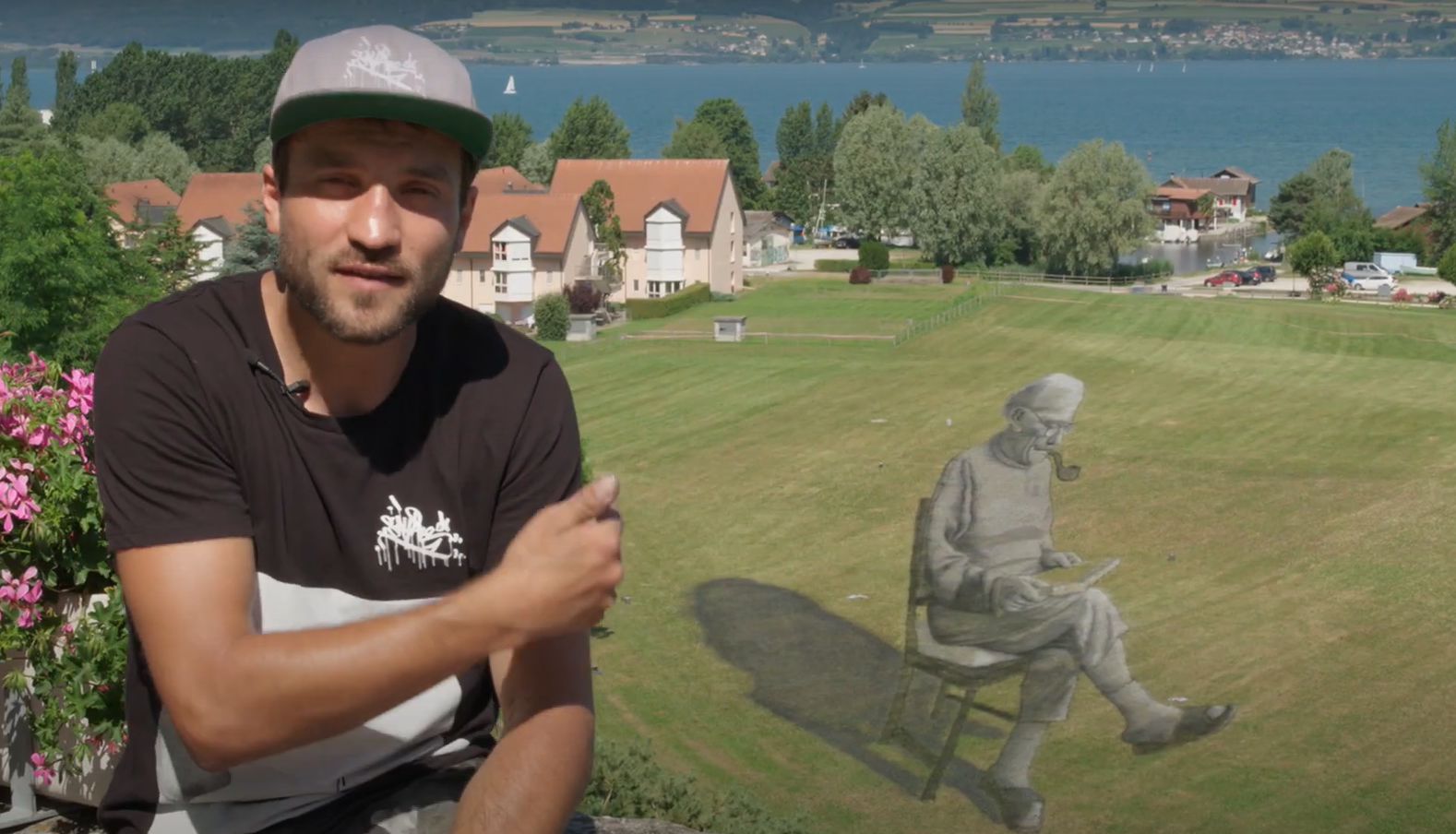
- Saype in 2019
- Born: Guillaume Legros; February 17, 1989; Belfort, France
- Known for: Biodegradable land art painting
- Website: https://www.saype-artiste.com/

Saype (born February 17, 1989, in Belfort, France) is a contemporary artist. He is known for creating ultra-realistic giant paintings in nature using a biodegradable paint he invented himself. In 2019, Forbes magazine ranked him among the 30 most influential people under 30 in art and culture.

== Biography ==
Guillaume Legros was born in Belfort on February 17, 1989, and grew up in Évette-Salbert, on the French-Swiss border. He trained as a nurse and practiced this profession in parallel with his artistic activity for nearly 7 years. He believes that being a nurse had an impact on his artwork by bringing him closer to "existential questions such as the suffering of the human being".

Guillaume Legros is known under the pseudonym Saype, which is formed from the contraction of "say" and "peace", two words he used in graffiti from an early age. As an artist, Saype is self-taught; he began painting graffiti in the street at the age of fourteen. His first works, made in his studio, were first exhibited in art galleries at the age of sixteen. Saype specialises in grass painting and ephemeral land art. The artworks disappear after a month due to regrowth of the grass, the weather and the passage of visitors. Saype states that he wants to draw people's attention and impact mentalities with his monumental artworks without leaving a trace in nature.

== Works ==
Saype's first work in nature, L'Amour, was created in 2015 in the French Alps. It was then the largest fresco on grass in the world. He then broke this 1,200 m2 record several times. The accessibility of drones at that time gave new perspectives and allowed him to immortalize his works.

In 2018, he joined forces with the SOS Méditerranée NGO and created the Message from Future fresco near the United Nations Office at Geneva. The project aimed to pay tribute to the organisation's volunteers who rescue migrants at sea. The action notably prompted elected officials to ask the government to offer a Swiss flag to the rescue vessel Aquarius.

On June 15, 2019, Saype launched its Beyond Walls project, which aims to connect the five continents through the largest symbolic human chain in the world. The first stop was the Champ de Mars, at the foot of the Eiffel Tower, in Paris. For the realization of the work, the Champ de Mars was closed to the public for two weeks, a historic first. The 600-meter-long fresco depicts hands holding each other. Between 2019 and 2020, more than a dozen cities are associated with the project. In 2020, it connected Ouagadougou, Yamoussoukro, Turin and Istanbul. In 2021, Saype painted in the township of Philippi, Cape Town, in the city of Ganvié, marked by a history of slavery, and exhibited at the World Expo in Dubai. In 2022, he participated in the Venice Biennale with a fresco drifting on the Grand Canal.

In 2021 and 2022, Saype painted in front of the headquarters of the United Nations in New York, Geneva and Nairobi, on the occasion of the organization's 75th anniversary. World in Progress is described as "a message of hope," depicting the creation of an ideal world imagined by two children.

== Technique ==
Saype is a pioneer in the field of painting on grass and his work falls between land and street art. His creations are based on a biodegradable paint, composed of water, chalk, charcoal and casein. Saype developed it himself after a year of research, aiming to minimize environmental impact while maintaining an adherence with the earth. The artworks are visible from the sky for a few weeks, then disappear as nature dictates. They are reproduced in lithographs and unique prints signed by the artist.

Beyond his ephemeral works in nature, Saype also creates in his studio and exhibits in galleries with his series Métros and Les Aurores. These brush and airbrush works combine media, including canvas and plexiglas, to give an impression of depth.

== Gallery ==
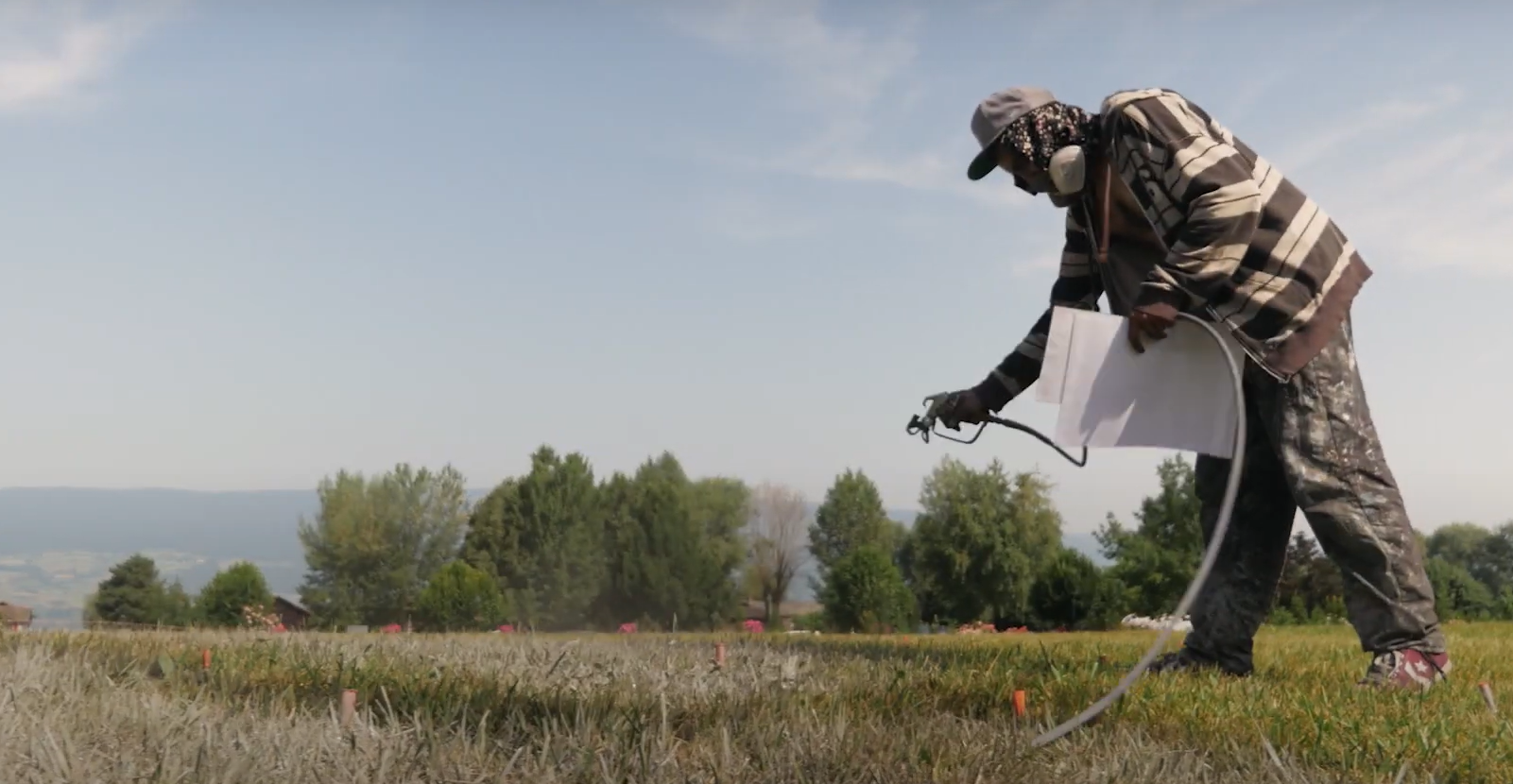
Saype (Guillaume Legros) painting grass for the ArtiChoke festival, 2019

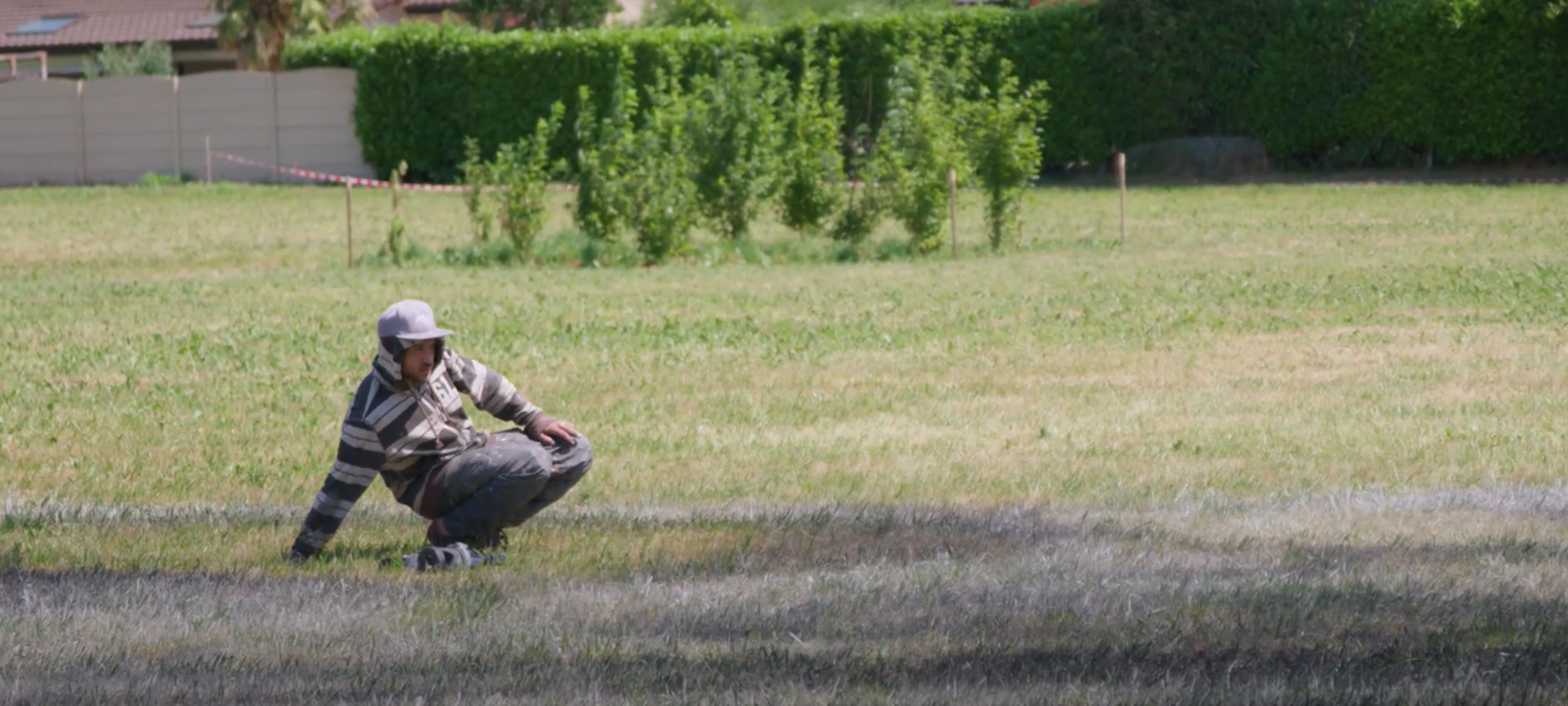
Saype (Guillaume Legros) at work for the ArtiChoke festival, 2019

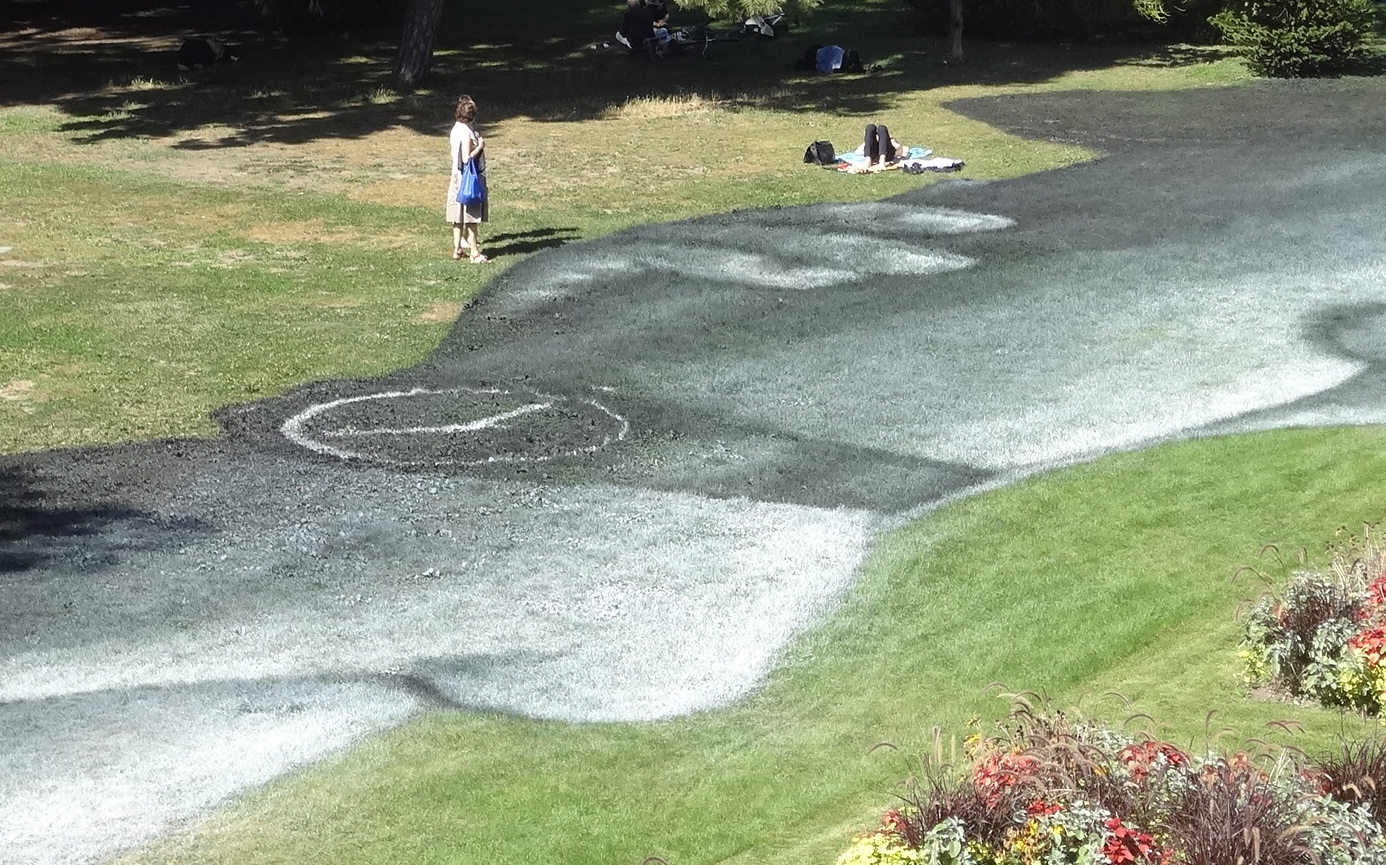
Beyond Walls by Saype, Geneva, 2019

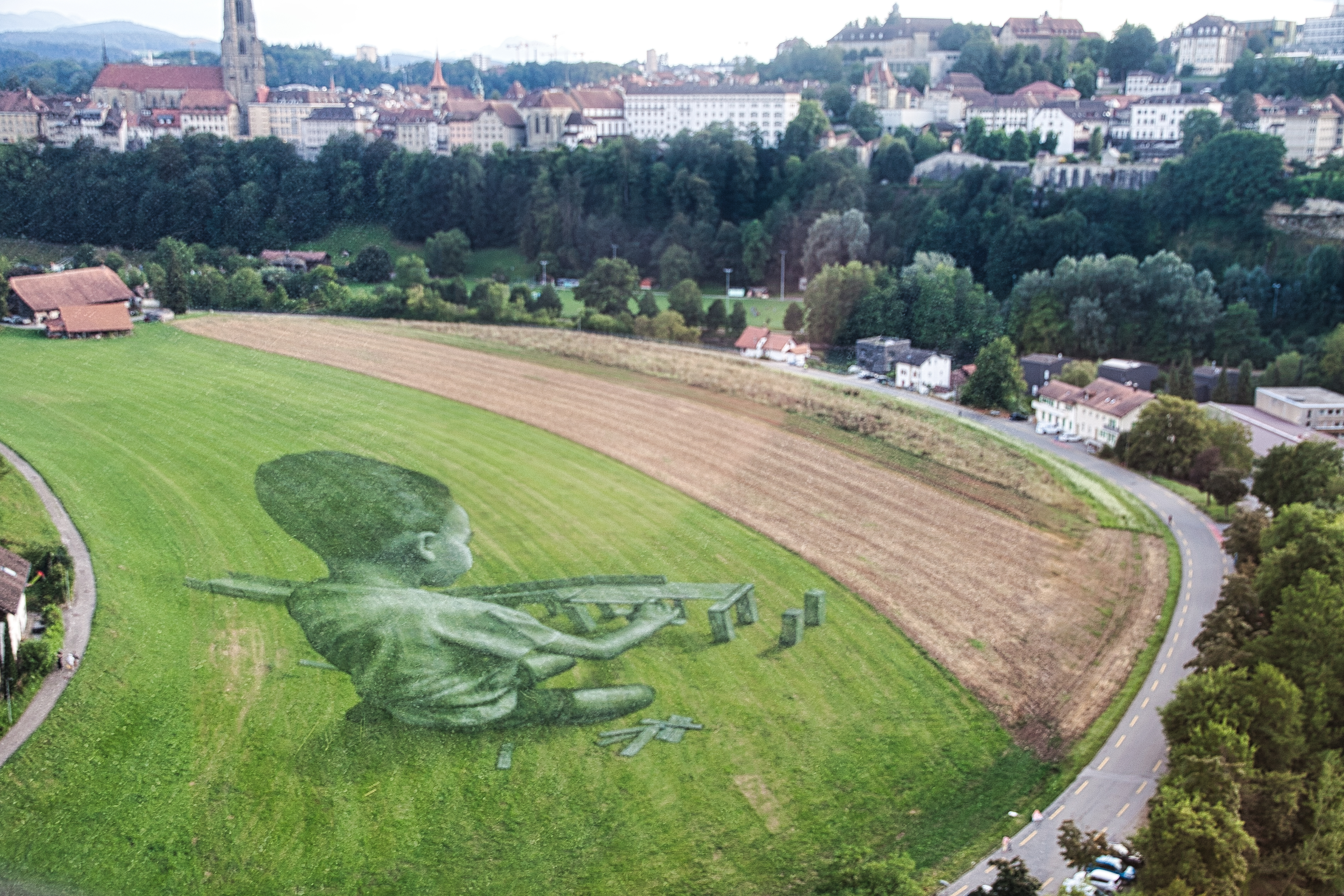
Bridges by Saype, Fribourg,2024
