= Allaine =

River in Switzerland

Allaine l'Allan (m, lower course)
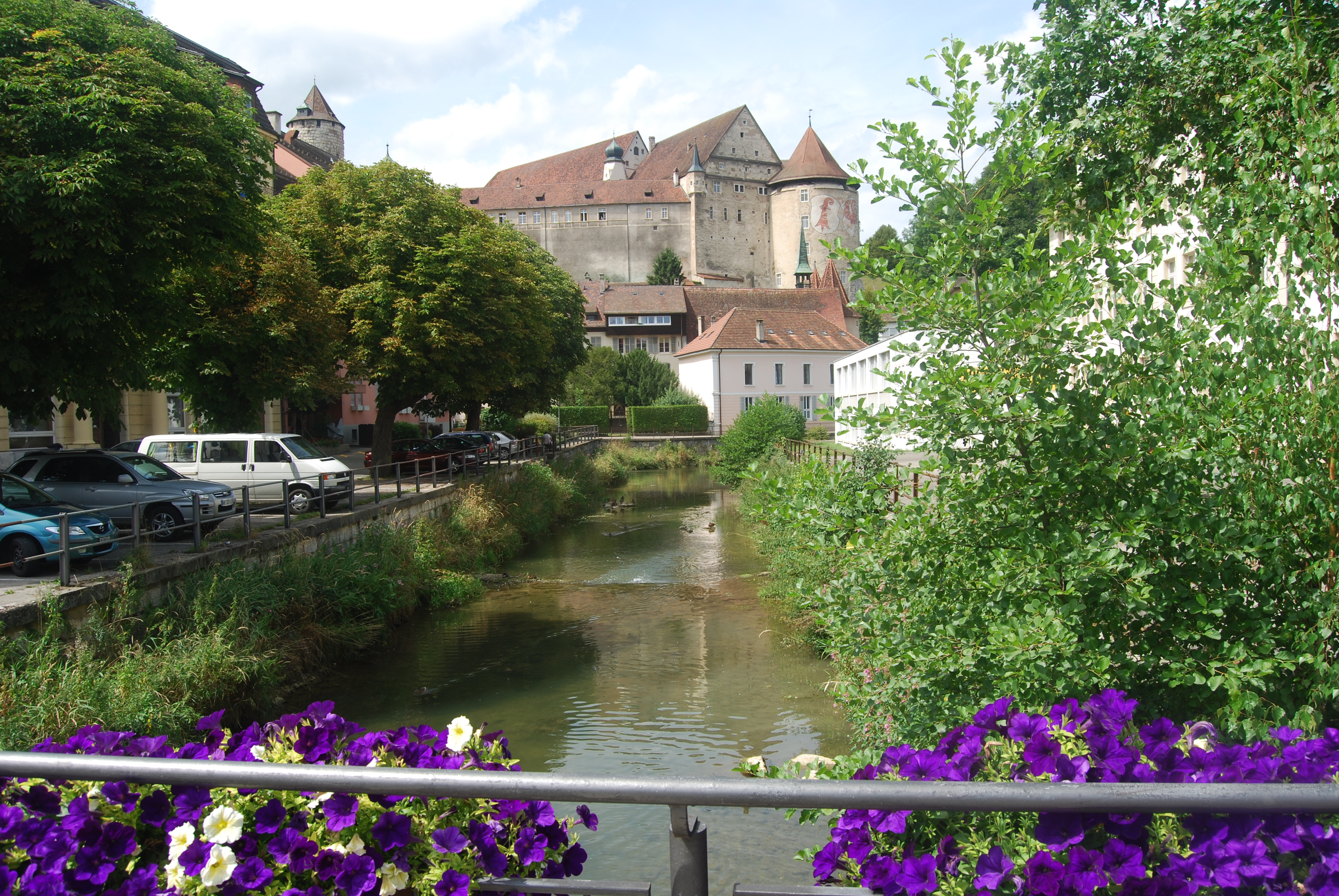
- The Allaine in Porrentruy

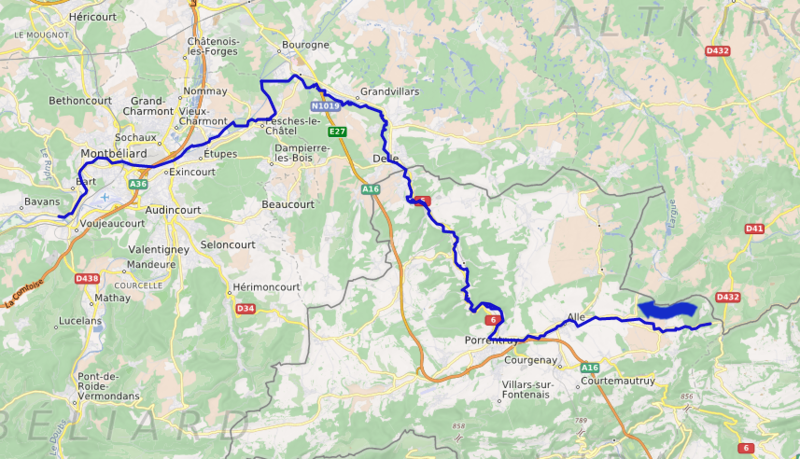
- Native name: l'Allaine (French)

Location
- Countries: Switzerland, France

Physical characteristics
- Source
  - location: Above Charmoille near Porrentruy in the Swiss Jura Mountains
  - coordinates: 47.42939°N 7.23038°E
  - elevation: 598 m (1,962 ft)
- Mouth
  - location: Doubs near Montbéliard
  - coordinates: 47.4785°N 6.7597°E
  - elevation: 335 m (1,099 ft)
- Length: 65 km (40 mi)
- Basin size: 322 km^{2} (124 sq mi)

Basin features
- Progression: Doubs→ Saône→ Rhône→ Mediterranean Sea

The Allaine (French: l'Allaine [lalɛn] (f), in its lower course l'Allan [lalɑ̃] (m), (German: Hall) is a 65 km long river in northwestern Switzerland and eastern France. Its source is above the village Charmoille, in the Swiss Jura Mountains. Downstream from its confluence with the Bourbeuse and the Canal du Rhône au Rhin, near Méziré, it is called the Allan. It is a right tributary of the Doubs, which it joins a few km downstream from Montbéliard, where it takes the Savoureuse with it, a river with its sources in the southern Vosges.

The Allaine/Allan flows through the following cantons, departments and towns:

- Canton of Jura (CH): Charmoille, Porrentruy
- Territoire de Belfort (F): Delle, Grandvillars
- Doubs (F): Montbéliard
