= Belfort Gap =

Flat area in Eastern France

Coordinates: 47°33′55″N 06°45′15″E

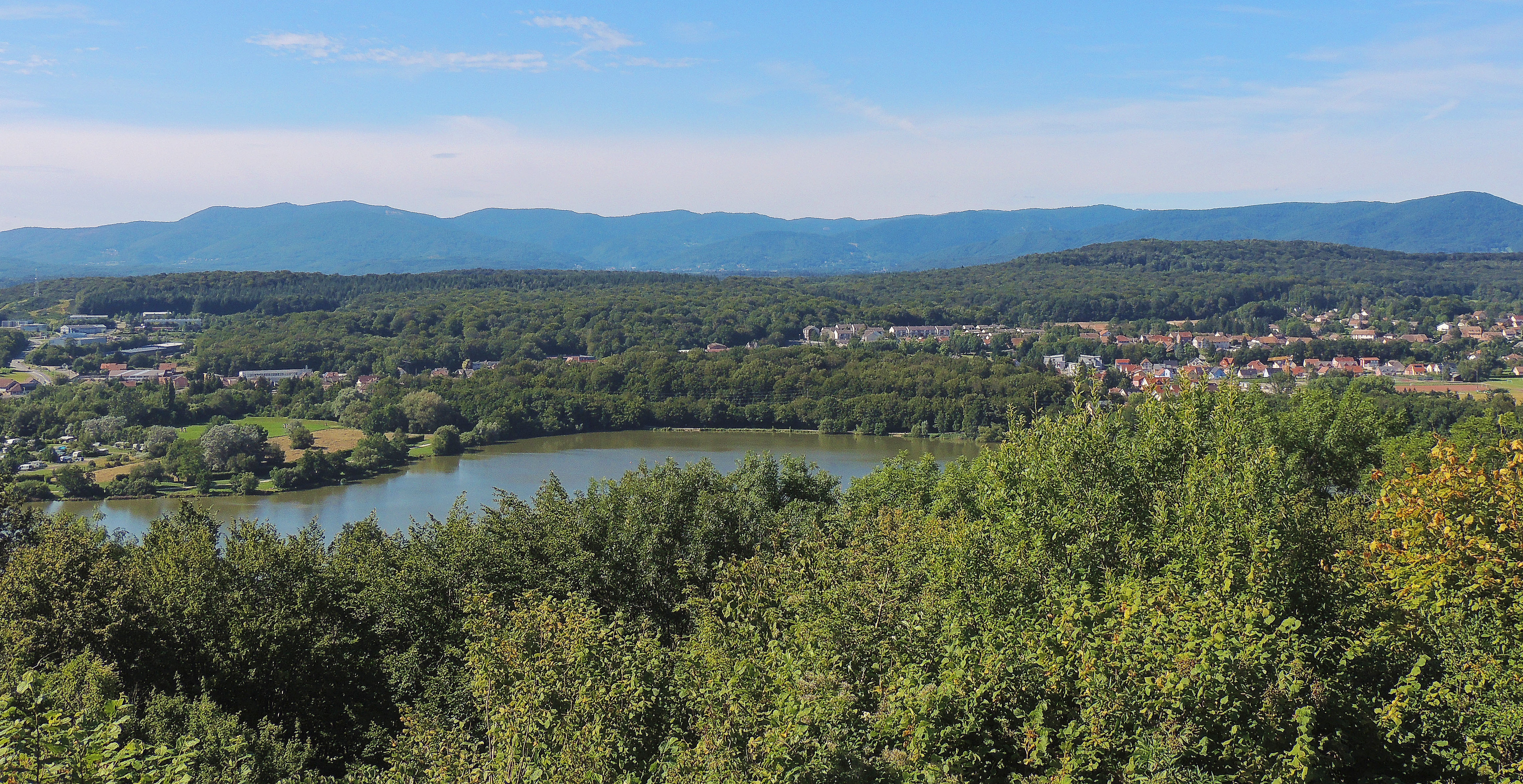
View south from Offemont, across the Belfort Gap toward the Jura.

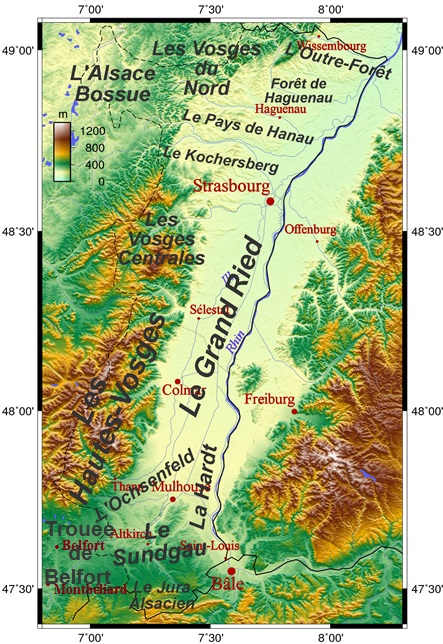
The Belfort Gap (in the southwest) and the other regions of Alsace.

The Belfort Gap (French: Trouée de Belfort) or Burgundian Gate (German: Burgundische Pforte) is the area of relatively flat terrain in Eastern France between the Vosges Mountains to the north and the Jura Mountains to the south. It marks the watershed between the drainage basins of the River Rhine to the east and the River Rhône to the west, part of the European Watershed between the North Sea and the Mediterranean Sea. It is also the boundary between the historic regions of Burgundy to the west and Alsace to the east, and as such has marked the Franco-German border for long periods of its history.

== Geography ==
The Belfort Gap (French: Trouée de Belfort) or Burgundian Gate (German: Burgundische Pforte) is the area of relatively flat terrain in France between the Vosges Mountains to the north and the Jura Mountains to the south, connecting Franche-Comté in the West and Alsace in the east. It marks the watershed between the drainage basins of the River Rhône to the west and the River Rhine to the east. It is thus part of the European Watershed between the North Sea and the Mediterranean Sea.

Its elevation varies between its lowest level in the Doubs valley at 315 m (1,033 ft) in Montbéliard, and Mont Salbert 651 m (2,136 ft). The roughly 40 km (25 mi) wide terrain or according to others the 20 km wide corridor of the Belfort gap connects the French département of Haut-Rhin, south of the région Alsace and the Territoire de Belfort, north of the région Franche-Comté and borders the departments of Haute-Saône, and Doubs.

The passage allows warm Mediterranean air flows to advect northeastwards into the Upper Rhine Plain and the Middle Rhine Valley.

Lines of communication that traverse the Belfort Gap include the French Route nationale 83 and the A36 autoroute, the railway line from Basel to Paris and the LGV Rhin-Rhône high-speed railway, as well as the Rhône-Rhine Canal.

== History ==
The Belfort Gap is first recorded as playing a military role in 58 BC, when Julius Caesar marched his army through it to confront the Germanic chieftain Ariovistus, whom he defeated at the Battle of the Vosges probably fought in the vicinity of modern Mulhouse. During the Migration Period of the 5th century, the Germanic Burgundians and Alemanni settled in and shared the Belfort Gap, with the Burgundians showing the most predominance in the region.

In the early 6th century, both Burgundy and Alemannia were conquered by the Kingdom of Francia, but the Belfort Gap remained the linguistic border between the German and French language, as the Burgundians had Christianized early and had been early adopters of the Latin language throughout their realm.

Francia grew to become the Carolingian Empire until it fell apart in the late ninth century, whereupon the Belfort Gap again became a border, this time between East Francia (later the Kingdom of Germany) to the east and the Kingdom of Burgundy-Arles to the west. By 1033 both kingdoms had been incorporated into the Holy Roman Empire. Thereafter local subdivisions started to become more important, which on the Arlésien side meant the County of Burgundy, and from 1042 also the County of Montbéliard (German: Grafschaft Mömpelgard); the territory on the German side was initially part of the stem duchy of Swabia, later the Alsatian Sundgau ("the southern Gau").

During the Late Middle Ages, in 1324 the Austrian House of Habsburg acquired first the Sundgau and in 1493 the County of Burgundy (more usually known in this period as the Franche-Comté).

Due to the devastation of the 30 years war, about half of the population of the Belfort gap had perished. Immediately after the war, many German families from neighboring regions settled in and repopulated the region. Under the 1648 Peace of Westphalia, the Habsburgs were obliged to cede the Sundgau to the Kingdom of France and the Belfort Gap therefore became the border between Alsace and Habsburg Franche-Comté, but not for long: under the 1678 Treaties of Nijmegen France acquired Franche-Comté too.

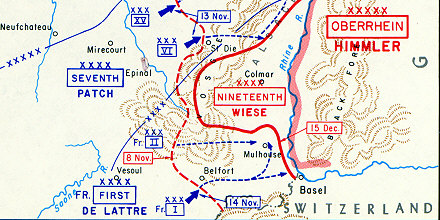
The Belfort Gap is visible in the bottom centre of this map of the 1944 campaign.

The Belfort Gap acquired renewed significance in the series of Franco-German wars in the nineteenth and early twentieth centuries. During the Franco-Prussian War, the Prussian army invaded France via the Wissembourg Gap and then swept down the length of Alsace and laid siege to Belfort, hoping to seize the city and then rush on through the Belfort Gap into central France. The siege ended up dragging on for months, and an armistice was signed before it could be brought to a decisive conclusion. The wider war had delivered a conclusive result, however, and under the resulting Treaty of Versailles (1871) Alsace and Lorraine were ceded by France to the newly-established German Empire. In 1871, the language border was used to determine the demarcation line between Alsace and Burgundy, and France was thereby able to retain Belfort. It had however become a border town again, and a series of fortifications was therefore thrown up to protect it from any future German attack.

== 20th century ==
At the outbreak of the First World War, French troops invaded Germany through the Belfort Gap, leading to the bloody Battles of the Frontiers. The most recent military advance through the Belfort Gap was that of the French I Corps in November 1944, under General De Lattre.
