= Jean-Marie Marconot =

French sociolinguist (1938–2021)

- Born: 17 August 1938; Évette-Salbert, France
- Died: 11 January 2021 (aged 82); Nîmes, France
- Occupation: Sociolinguist

Jean-Marie Marconot (17 August 1938 — 11 January 2021) was a French sociolinguist.

== Biography ==
Marconot studied classical literature, theology, and linguistics and earned a doctoral degree in 1987 under the direction of Robèrt Lafont. An Assumptionist, he began living in Gard in 1969 and became a member of the French National Centre for Scientific Research. He was primarily interested in the Bible, anthropology, and regional issues. He also wrote three essays in Occitan. At the end of 2005, he edited Lettre and L'Almanach de Pissevin.

Jean-Marie Marconot died in Nîmes on 11 January 2021 at the age of 82.

== Works ==
- Comment ils prêchent : analyse du langage religieux, 22 sermons de Toussaint (1976)
- L'Analyse de la conversation : le livre de Vauvert (1985)
- La ZUP de Nîmes : son mode de vie, son langage (1988)
- Nimes, le quartier Gambetta : portrait social d'un quartier ancien (1988)
- Nîmes : hier, demain (1990)
- Pauvres bougres et bons enfants : le quartier Richelieu à Nîmes : l'inondation du 3 octobre 1988 et les événements qui suivirent (1991)
- L'Embarras de la foire de Beaucaire (1993)
- Nîmes : problèmes d'aujourd'hui (1994)
- Le Héros et l'héroïne bibliques dans la culture (1997)
- Habiter en garrigue, une tradition nîmoise : le quartier Russan-Terres de Rouvière : essai d'anthropologie (1997)
- L'Interdit et le sacré dans les religions de la Bible et de l'Égypte (1998)
- Li bourgadieiro (1998)
- Les Enfants de Saint-Gilles : leurs familles, leurs quartiers (1998)
- Poèmes et écrits des quartiers (1999)
- Représentations des maladies et de la guérison dans la Bible et ses traditions (2001)
- Derrière les ponts : les Marronniers et la route d'Arles, Possac-Chalvidan (2001)
- Entre ville et village : les récits de Saint-Gilles (2001)
- Figures nîmoises dans les contes : les lieux, les langues et les symboles (2001)
- De l'école au quartier : la culture des lieux (2002)
- Une école et son quartier : l'Enclos-Rey à Nîmes (2002)
- Les Cafés de la ville (2004)
- Vie de saint Gilles : édition bilingue : texte et commentaire des Bollandistes (2005)
- Les Femmes et les Quartiers (2005)
- Les Balcons de la ville (2005)
- Le Problème du logement (2006)
- Tradition des poètes nîmois : Jean Michel (1603-1689), Jean Reboul (1796-1864), Antoine Bigot (1825-1897) (2007)
- Pissevin : mémoire d'un quartier et question urbaine (2007)
- Anthropologie occitane (2007)
- Vers-Pont-du-Gard (2008)
- Les Derniers Poèmes (2008)
- Saint-Gilles, l'abbatiale romane (2008)
- Les Communautés maghrébines : contraintes et cultures (2009)
- Nîmes : almanach des quartiers (2010)
- La Bible et la guerre, la non-violence (2011)
- Redessan : le vin des Tabernolles (2012)
- Les Copropriétés : importance et problèmes (2012)
- L'Entr'aide gardoise : 40 ans de logements foyers (2013)
- HLM, copropriétés et lotissements, les élections (2014)
- Garrigue, capitelles et masets : études et poèmes (2015)
- Espoir et Banlieue : chronique d'une association (2016)
- Le Journal de quartier : études et documents (2016)
- Le Graffe, le rap et le slam : société et culture (2017)
- La Banlieue, les quartiers (2017)
