= Éloie =

- Commune
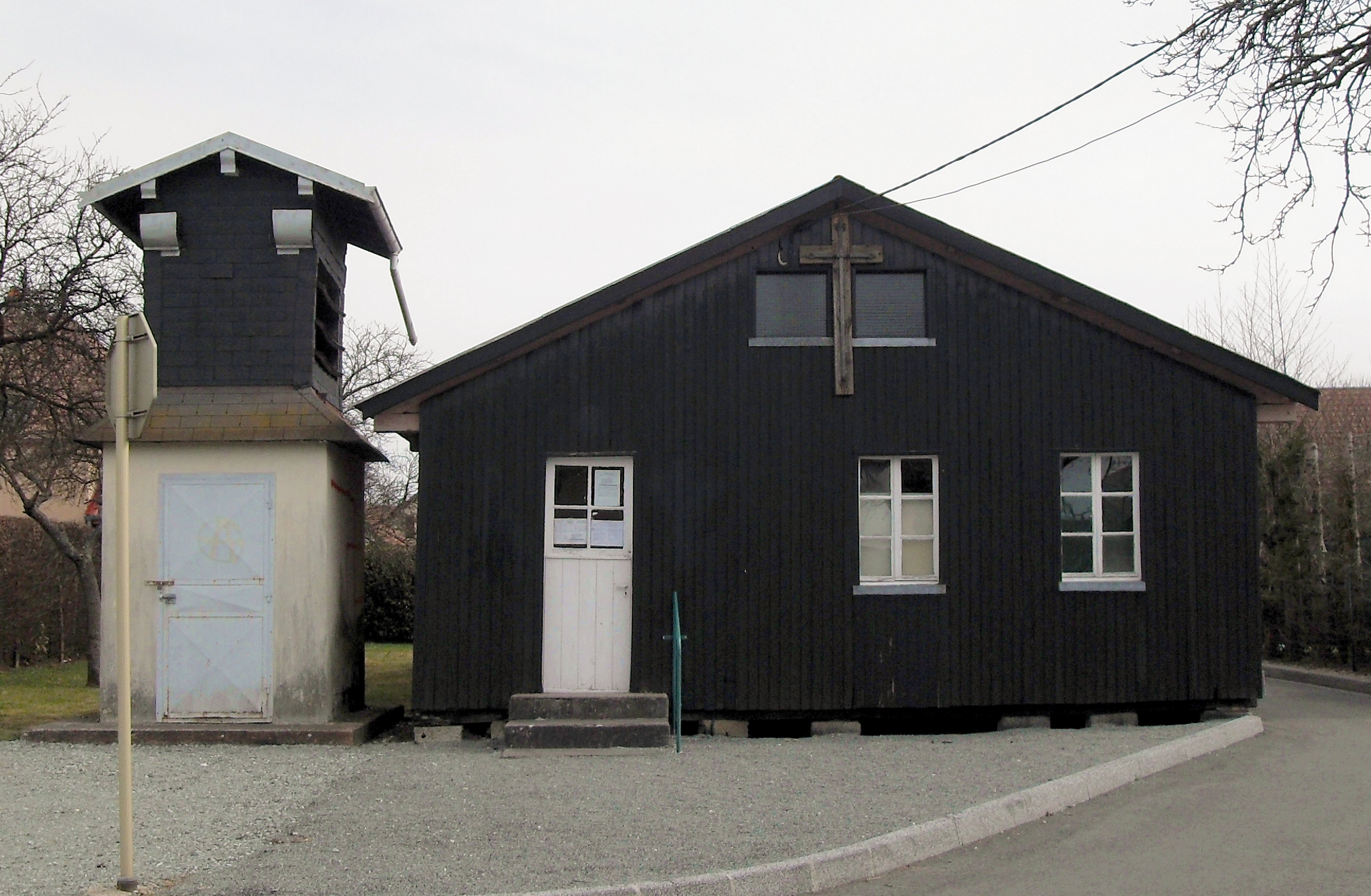
- Chapel in Éloie

- Coat of arms
- Location of Éloie
- Location within France Location within Bourgogne-Franche-Comté
- Coordinates: 47°41′28″N 6°52′28″E
- Country: France
- Region: Bourgogne-Franche-Comté
- Department: Territoire de Belfort
- Arrondissement: Belfort
- Canton: Valdoie
- Intercommunality: Grand Belfort

Government
  - Mayor (2020–2026): Éric Gilbert
- Area^{1}: 5.55 km^{2} (2.14 sq mi)
- Highest elevation: 490 m (1,610 ft)
- Lowest elevation: 384 m (1,260 ft)
- Population (2023): 952
  - Density: 172/km^{2} (444/sq mi)
- Time zone: UTC+01:00 (CET)
  - Summer (DST): UTC+02:00 (CEST)
- INSEE/Postal code: 90037 /90300
- ^{1} French Land Register data, which excludes lakes, ponds, glaciers > 1 km^{2} (0.386 sq mi or 247 acres) and river estuaries.

Éloie (French pronunciation: [elwa]) is a commune in the Territoire de Belfort department in Bourgogne-Franche-Comté in northeastern France.

== See also ==
- Communes of the Territoire de Belfort department
