= Essert, Territoire de Belfort =

Essert
- Commune
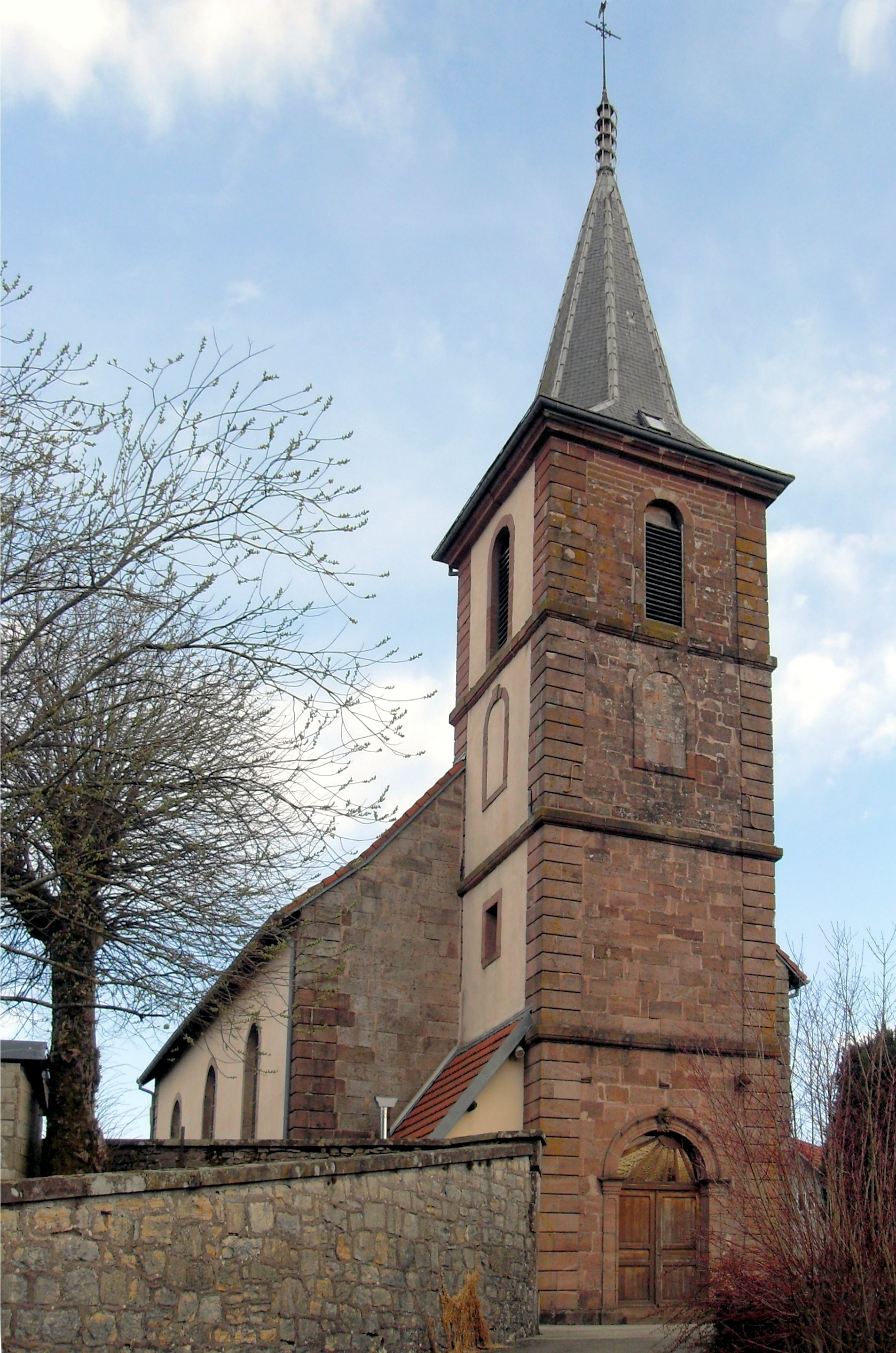
- Saint-Léger Church

- Coat of arms
- Location of Essert
- Location within France Location within Bourgogne-Franche-Comté
- Coordinates: 47°37′58″N 6°49′02″E
- Country: France
- Region: Bourgogne-Franche-Comté
- Department: Territoire de Belfort
- Arrondissement: Belfort
- Canton: Bavilliers
- Intercommunality: Grand Belfort

Government
  - Mayor (2021–2026): Dominique Jeannin
- Area^{1}: 7.01 km^{2} (2.71 sq mi)
- Highest elevation: 511 m (1,677 ft)
- Lowest elevation: 349 m (1,145 ft)
- Population (2023): 3,417
  - Density: 487/km^{2} (1,260/sq mi)
- Time zone: UTC+01:00 (CET)
  - Summer (DST): UTC+02:00 (CEST)
- INSEE/Postal code: 90039 /90850
- ^{1} French Land Register data, which excludes lakes, ponds, glaciers > 1 km^{2} (0.386 sq mi or 247 acres) and river estuaries.

Essert (French pronunciation: [esɛʁ]) is a commune in the Territoire de Belfort department in Bourgogne-Franche-Comté in northeastern France.

== Population ==
Historical population
Year	Pop.	±% p.a.
1968	1,545	—
1975	1,561	+0.15%
1982	2,468	+6.76%
1990	2,514	+0.23%
1999	2,742	+0.97%
2007	3,128	+1.66%
2012	3,163	+0.22%
2017	3,306	+0.89%
2023	3,417	+0.55%
Source: INSEE

== See also ==
- Communes of the Territoire de Belfort department
