= Valdoie =

- Commune
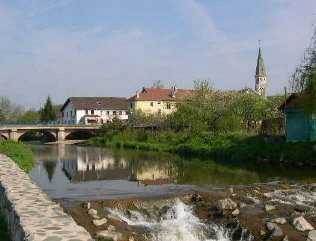
- A view of the bridge crossing the river and the church tower, visible at the bottom right

- Coat of arms
- Location of Valdoie
- Location within France Location within Bourgogne-Franche-Comté
- Coordinates: 47°40′02″N 6°50′31″E
- Country: France
- Region: Bourgogne-Franche-Comté
- Department: Territoire de Belfort
- Arrondissement: Belfort
- Canton: Valdoie
- Intercommunality: Grand Belfort

Government
  - Mayor (2020–2026): Marie-France Céfis
- Area^{1}: 4.66 km^{2} (1.80 sq mi)
- Highest elevation: 438 m (1,437 ft)
- Lowest elevation: 370 m (1,210 ft)
- Population (2023): 5,175
  - Density: 1,110/km^{2} (2,880/sq mi)
- Time zone: UTC+01:00 (CET)
  - Summer (DST): UTC+02:00 (CEST)
- INSEE/Postal code: 90099 /90300
- ^{1} French Land Register data, which excludes lakes, ponds, glaciers > 1 km^{2} (0.386 sq mi or 247 acres) and river estuaries.

Valdoie (French pronunciation: [valdwa]) is a commune in the Territoire de Belfort department in Bourgogne-Franche-Comté in northeastern France. It is located to the North of the city of Belfort and comprises part of greater Belfort.

== Name ==
Valdoie is situated on the river Savoureuse (Doubs basin). The name is thought to have come from combining the Latin word Vadum (meaning shallow crossing) and the Celtic word Oye (meaning water or river).

== Population ==
Historical population
| Year | Pop. | ±% p.a. |
|---|---|---|
| 1968 | 3,983 | — |
| 1975 | 4,466 | +1.65% |
| 1982 | 4,572 | +0.34% |
| 1990 | 4,314 | −0.72% |
| 1999 | 4,843 | +1.29% |
| 2007 | 5,022 | +0.45% |
| 2012 | 5,313 | +1.13% |
| 2017 | 5,300 | −0.05% |
| 2023 | 5,175 | −0.40% |
Source: INSEE

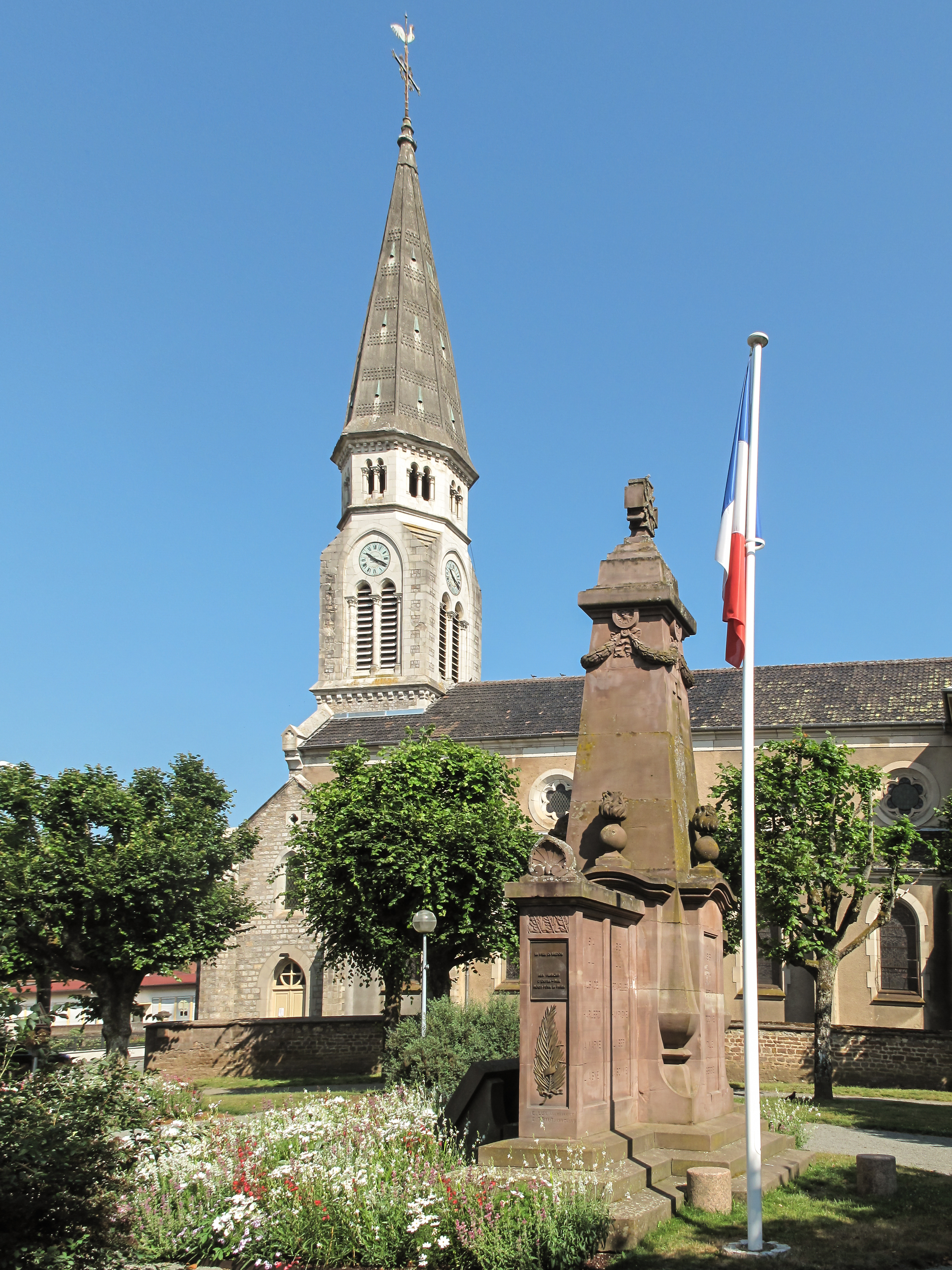
Valdoie, church (église Saint-Joseph) with war monument

== See also ==
- Communes of the Territoire de Belfort department
