= Vétrigne =

- Commune
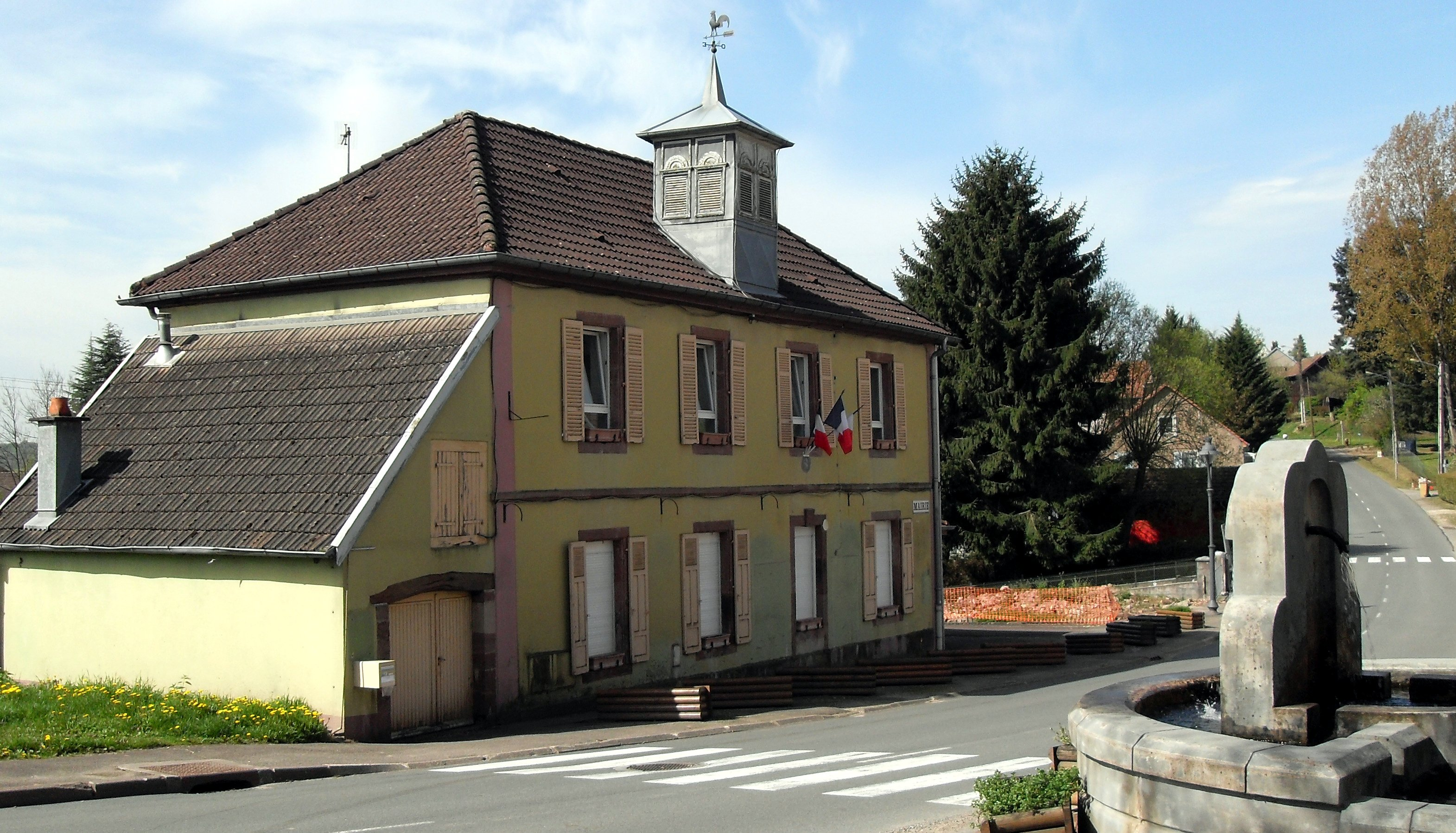
- The town hall and the fountain

- Coat of arms
- Location of Vétrigne
- Location within France Location within Bourgogne-Franche-Comté
- Coordinates: 47°40′06″N 6°53′39″E
- Country: France
- Region: Bourgogne-Franche-Comté
- Department: Territoire de Belfort
- Arrondissement: Belfort
- Canton: Valdoie
- Intercommunality: Grand Belfort

Government
  - Mayor (2020–2026): Alain Salomon
- Area^{1}: 2.46 km^{2} (0.95 sq mi)
- Highest elevation: 472 m (1,549 ft)
- Lowest elevation: 357 m (1,171 ft)
- Population (2023): 636
  - Density: 259/km^{2} (670/sq mi)
- Time zone: UTC+01:00 (CET)
  - Summer (DST): UTC+02:00 (CEST)
- INSEE/Postal code: 90103 /90300
- ^{1} French Land Register data, which excludes lakes, ponds, glaciers > 1 km^{2} (0.386 sq mi or 247 acres) and river estuaries.

Vétrigne (French pronunciation: [vetʁiɲ]) is a commune in the Territoire de Belfort department in Bourgogne-Franche-Comté in northeastern France.

== See also ==
- Communes of the Territoire de Belfort department
