= Denney, Territoire de Belfort =

Denney
- Commune
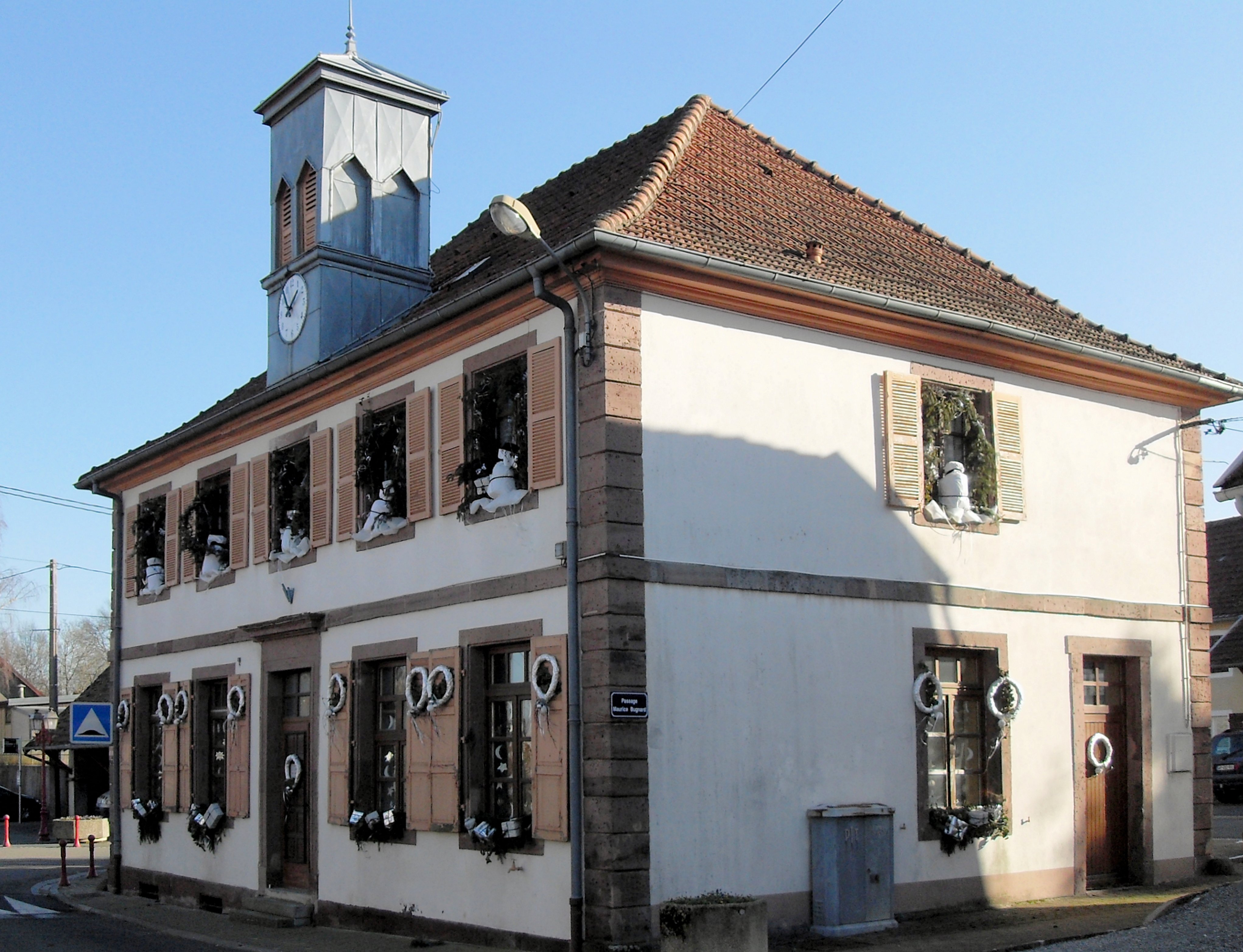
- Town hall

- Coat of arms
- Location of Denney
- Location within France Location within Bourgogne-Franche-Comté
- Coordinates: 47°39′35″N 6°55′05″E
- Country: France
- Region: Bourgogne-Franche-Comté
- Department: Territoire de Belfort
- Arrondissement: Belfort
- Canton: Valdoie
- Intercommunality: Grand Belfort

Government
  - Mayor (2023–2026): Dorothée Fernandez
- Area^{1}: 3.48 km^{2} (1.34 sq mi)
- Highest elevation: 430 m (1,410 ft)
- Lowest elevation: 348 m (1,142 ft)
- Population (2023): 763
  - Density: 219/km^{2} (568/sq mi)
- Time zone: UTC+01:00 (CET)
  - Summer (DST): UTC+02:00 (CEST)
- INSEE/Postal code: 90034 /90160
- ^{1} French Land Register data, which excludes lakes, ponds, glaciers > 1 km^{2} (0.386 sq mi or 247 acres) and river estuaries.

Denney (French pronunciation: [dɛnɛ]) is a commune in the Territoire de Belfort department in Bourgogne-Franche-Comté in northeastern France.

== See also ==
- Communes of the Territoire de Belfort department
