= Cravanche =

- Commune
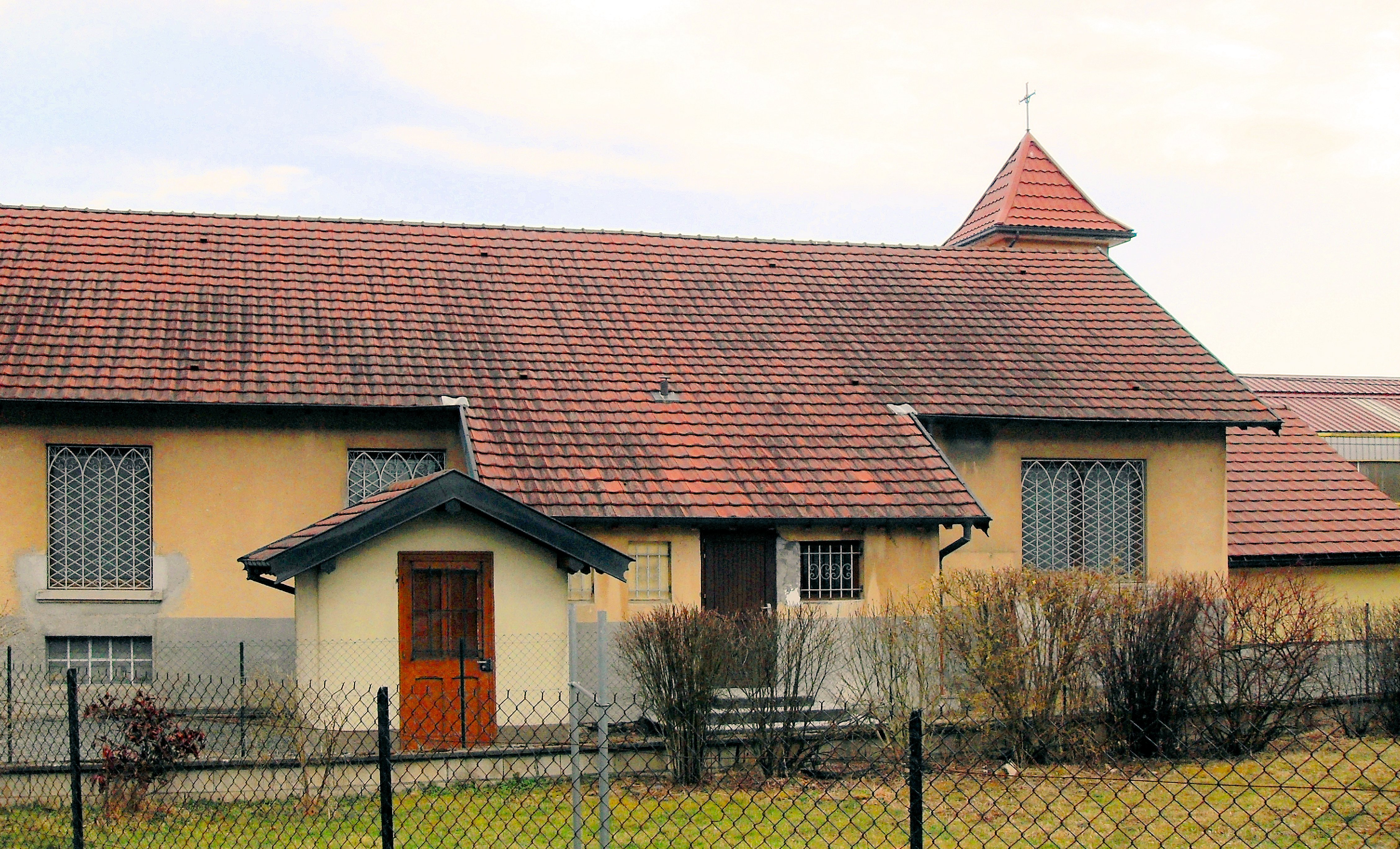
- Notre-Dame Chapel

- Coat of arms
- Location of Cravanche
- Location within France Location within Bourgogne-Franche-Comté
- Coordinates: 47°39′15″N 6°49′59″E
- Country: France
- Region: Bourgogne-Franche-Comté
- Department: Territoire de Belfort
- Arrondissement: Belfort
- Canton: Bavilliers
- Intercommunality: Grand Belfort

Government
  - Mayor (2022–2026): Renaud Veber
- Area^{1}: 1.35 km^{2} (0.52 sq mi)
- Highest elevation: 463 m (1,519 ft)
- Lowest elevation: 373 m (1,224 ft)
- Population (2023): 1,942
  - Density: 1,440/km^{2} (3,730/sq mi)
- Time zone: UTC+01:00 (CET)
  - Summer (DST): UTC+02:00 (CEST)
- INSEE/Postal code: 90029 /90300
- ^{1} French Land Register data, which excludes lakes, ponds, glaciers > 1 km^{2} (0.386 sq mi or 247 acres) and river estuaries.

Cravanche (French pronunciation: [kʁavɑ̃ʃ]) is a commune in the Territoire de Belfort department in Bourgogne-Franche-Comté in northeastern France.

== See also ==
- Communes of the Territoire de Belfort department
