= Savoureuse =

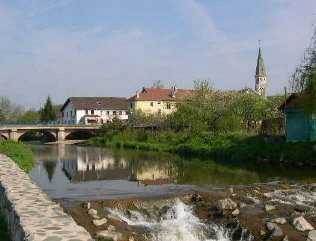

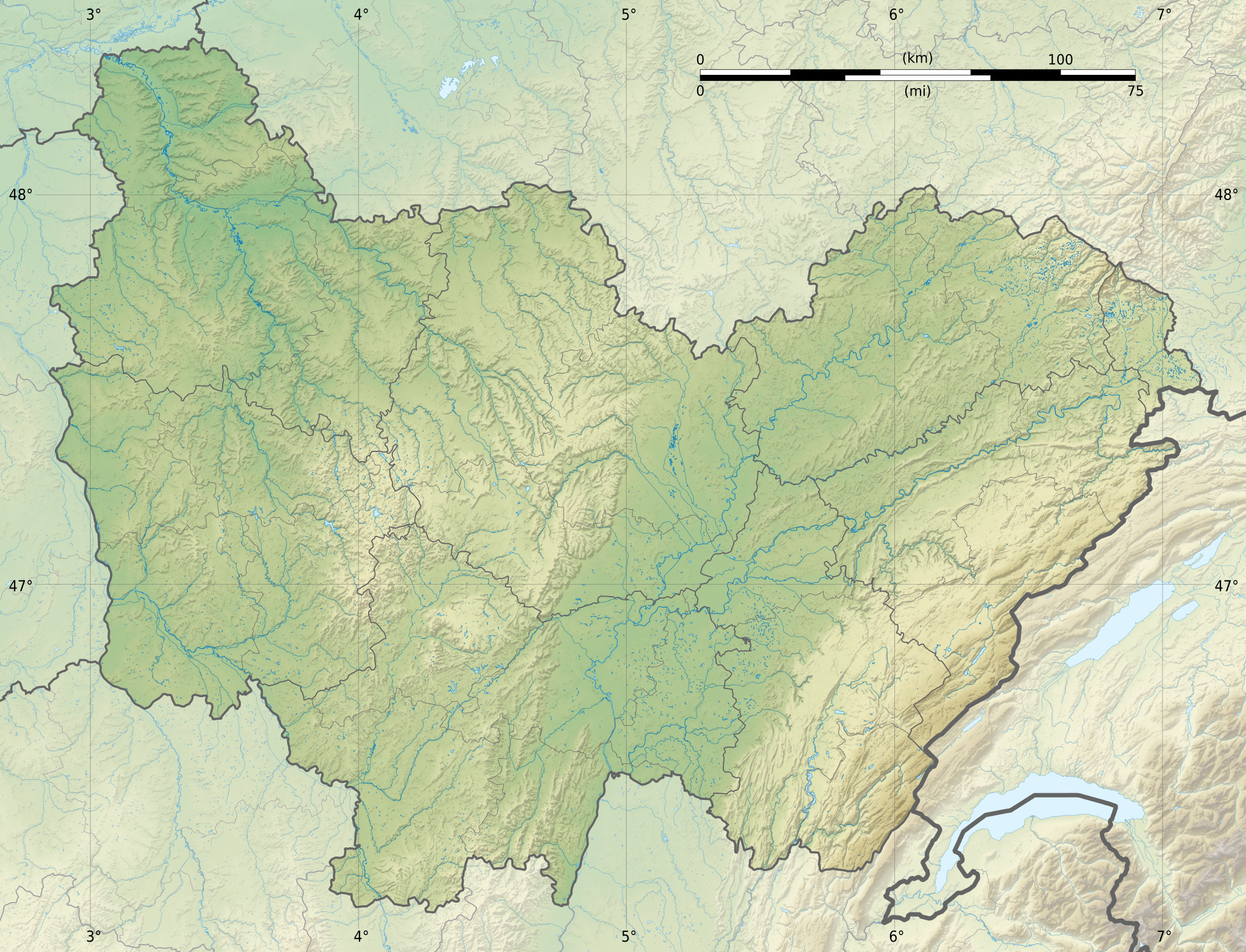
- Location within France Location within Bourgogne-Franche-Comté

Location
- Country: France

Physical characteristics
- Mouth: Allan
  - coordinates: 47.5109°N 6.8489°E
- Length: 41.2 km (25.6 mi)

Basin features
- Progression: Allan→ Doubs→ Saône→ Rhône→ Mediterranean Sea

The Savoureuse (French pronunciation: [savuʁøz]) is the principal river running through the Territoire de Belfort. Its source is in the Ballon d'Alsace at 1190m altitude. From here, it runs through the city of Belfort to the town of Sochaux where it joins the Allan, a tributary to the Doubs. It is 41.2 km (25.6 mi) long.
