= Sermamagny =

- Commune
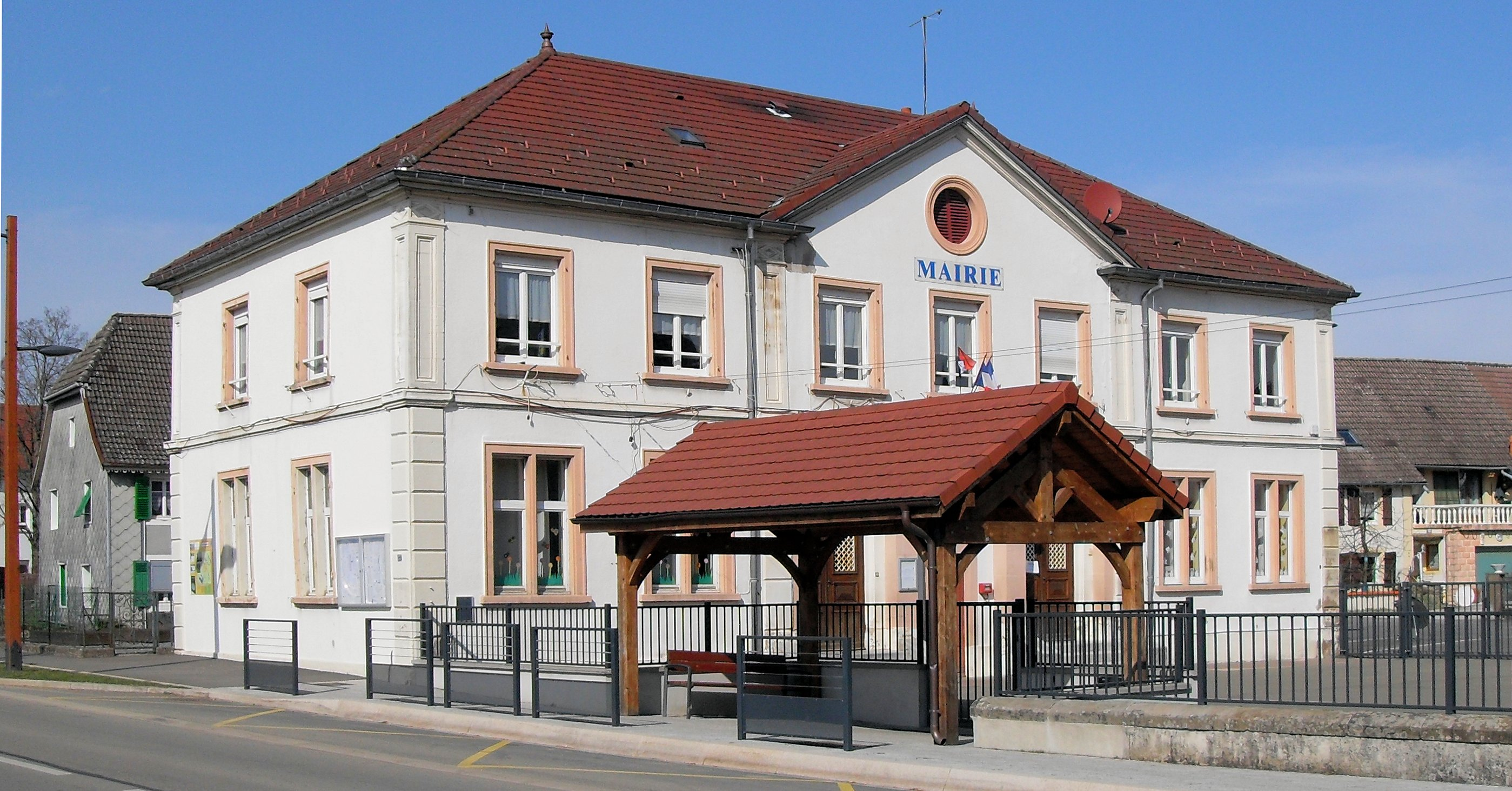
- Town hall

- Coat of arms
- Location of Sermamagny
- Location within France Location within Bourgogne-Franche-Comté
- Coordinates: 47°41′32″N 6°50′09″E
- Country: France
- Region: Bourgogne-Franche-Comté
- Department: Territoire de Belfort
- Arrondissement: Belfort
- Canton: Valdoie
- Intercommunality: Grand Belfort

Government
  - Mayor (2020–2026): Philippe Challant
- Area^{1}: 7.90 km^{2} (3.05 sq mi)
- Highest elevation: 423 m (1,388 ft)
- Lowest elevation: 384 m (1,260 ft)
- Population (2023): 929
  - Density: 118/km^{2} (305/sq mi)
- Time zone: UTC+01:00 (CET)
  - Summer (DST): UTC+02:00 (CEST)
- INSEE/Postal code: 90093 /90300
- ^{1} French Land Register data, which excludes lakes, ponds, glaciers > 1 km^{2} (0.386 sq mi or 247 acres) and river estuaries.

Sermamagny (French pronunciation: [sɛʁmamaɲi]) is a commune in Territoire de Belfort, a department in Bourgogne-Franche-Comté in northeastern France.

== See also ==
- Communes of the Territoire de Belfort department
- Eurockéennes
