= Canton of Valdoie =

Coordinates: 47.67°N 6.84°E

- Canton
- Situation of the canton of Valdoie in the department of Territoire de Belfort
- Country: France
- Region: Bourgogne-Franche-Comté
- Department: Territoire de Belfort
- No. of communes: {{{nbcomm}}}
- Population (2023): 15,576
- INSEE code: 9009

The canton of Valdoie is an administrative division of the Territoire de Belfort department, northeastern France. Its borders were modified at the French canton reorganisation which came into effect in March 2015. Its seat is in Valdoie.

It consists of the following communes:

1. Denney
2. Éloie
3. Évette-Salbert
4. Offemont
5. Roppe
6. Sermamagny
7. Valdoie
8. Vétrigne
