= Bavilliers =

- Commune
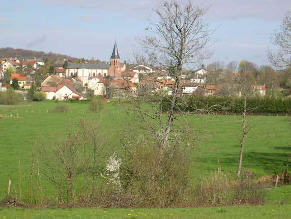
- The village of Bavilliers seen from the canal

- Coat of arms
- Location of Bavilliers
- Location within France Location within Bourgogne-Franche-Comté
- Coordinates: 47°37′13″N 6°49′53″E
- Country: France
- Region: Bourgogne-Franche-Comté
- Department: Territoire de Belfort
- Arrondissement: Belfort
- Canton: Bavilliers
- Intercommunality: Grand Belfort

Government
  - Mayor (2020–2026): Éric Koeberlé
- Area^{1}: 4.80 km^{2} (1.85 sq mi)
- Highest elevation: 433 m (1,421 ft)
- Lowest elevation: 343 m (1,125 ft)
- Population (2023): 4,678
  - Density: 975/km^{2} (2,520/sq mi)
- Time zone: UTC+01:00 (CET)
  - Summer (DST): UTC+02:00 (CEST)
- INSEE/Postal code: 90008 /90800
- ^{1} French Land Register data, which excludes lakes, ponds, glaciers > 1 km^{2} (0.386 sq mi or 247 acres) and river estuaries.

Bavilliers (French pronunciation: [bavije]) is a commune in the Territoire de Belfort department in Bourgogne-Franche-Comté in northeastern France.

== Population ==
Historical population
Year	Pop.	±% p.a.
1968	2,564	—
1975	3,454	+4.35%
1982	3,555	+0.41%
1990	4,408	+2.72%
1999	4,582	+0.43%
2007	4,809	+0.61%
2012	4,856	+0.19%
2017	4,726	−0.54%
2023	4,678	−0.17%
Source: INSEE

== See also ==
- Communes of the Territoire de Belfort department
