= Pérouse, Territoire de Belfort =

Pérouse
- Commune
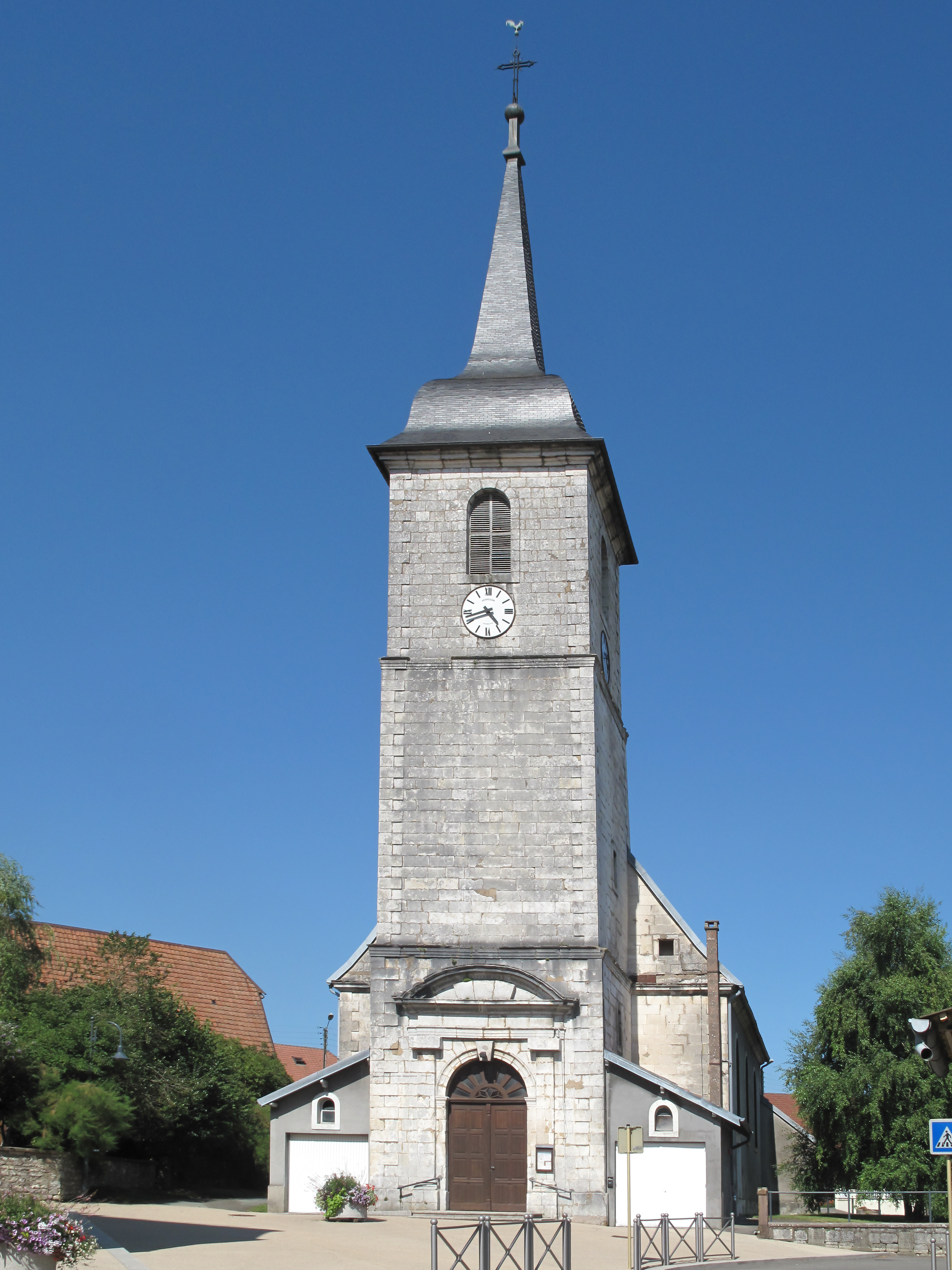
- The church of Saint-Mathieu

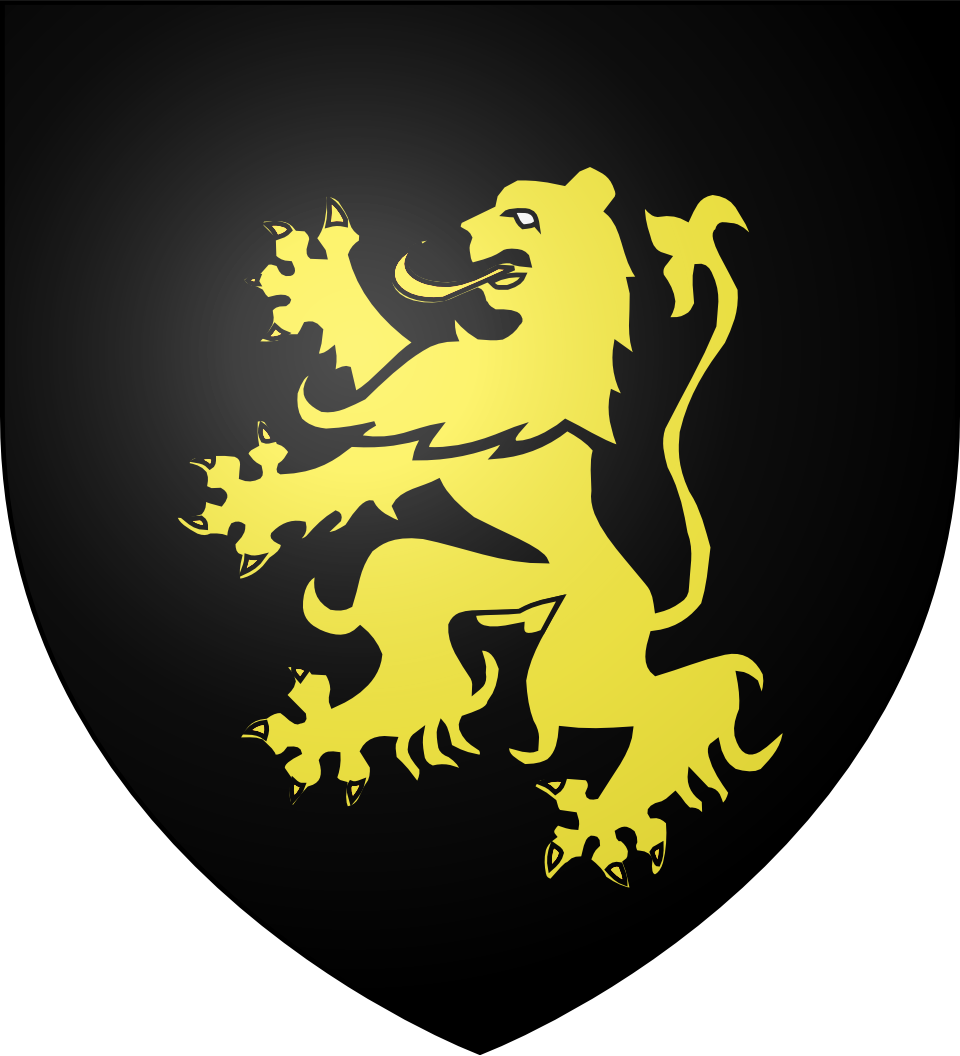
- Coat of arms
- Location of Pérouse
- Location within France Location within Bourgogne-Franche-Comté
- Coordinates: 47°38′16″N 6°53′28″E
- Country: France
- Region: Bourgogne-Franche-Comté
- Department: Territoire de Belfort
- Arrondissement: Belfort
- Canton: Bavilliers
- Intercommunality: Grand Belfort

Government
  - Mayor (2020–2026): Jean-Pierre Cnudde
- Area^{1}: 4.90 km^{2} (1.89 sq mi)
- Highest elevation: 443 m (1,453 ft)
- Lowest elevation: 354 m (1,161 ft)
- Population (2023): 1,196
  - Density: 244/km^{2} (632/sq mi)
- Time zone: UTC+01:00 (CET)
  - Summer (DST): UTC+02:00 (CEST)
- INSEE/Postal code: 90076 /90160
- ^{1} French Land Register data, which excludes lakes, ponds, glaciers > 1 km^{2} (0.386 sq mi or 247 acres) and river estuaries.

Pérouse (French pronunciation: [peʁuz]) is a commune in the Territoire de Belfort department in Bourgogne-Franche-Comté in northeastern France.

== See also ==
- Communes of the Territoire de Belfort department
