= Canton of Bavilliers =

Coordinates: 47.62°N 6.83°E

- Canton
- Situation of the canton of Bavilliers in the department of Territoire de Belfort
- Country: France
- Region: Bourgogne-Franche-Comté
- Department: Territoire de Belfort
- No. of communes: {{{nbcomm}}}
- Population (2023): 14,752
- INSEE code: 9001

The canton of Bavilliers is an administrative division of the Territoire de Belfort department, northeastern France. It was created at the French canton reorganisation which came into effect in March 2015. Its seat is in Bavilliers.

It consists of the following communes:

1. Bavilliers
2. Cravanche
3. Danjoutin
4. Essert
5. Pérouse
