= Cantons of Belfort =

Coordinates: 47.64°N 6.86°E

The cantons of Belfort are administrative divisions of the Territoire de Belfort department, in northeastern France. Since the French canton reorganisation which came into effect in March 2015, the town of Belfort is subdivided into 3 cantons. Their seat is in Belfort.

== Population ==
Name	Population (2019)	Cantonal Code
Canton of Belfort-1	15,529	9002
Canton of Belfort-2	16,836	9003
Canton of Belfort-3	14,078	9004
