= Évette-Salbert =

- Commune
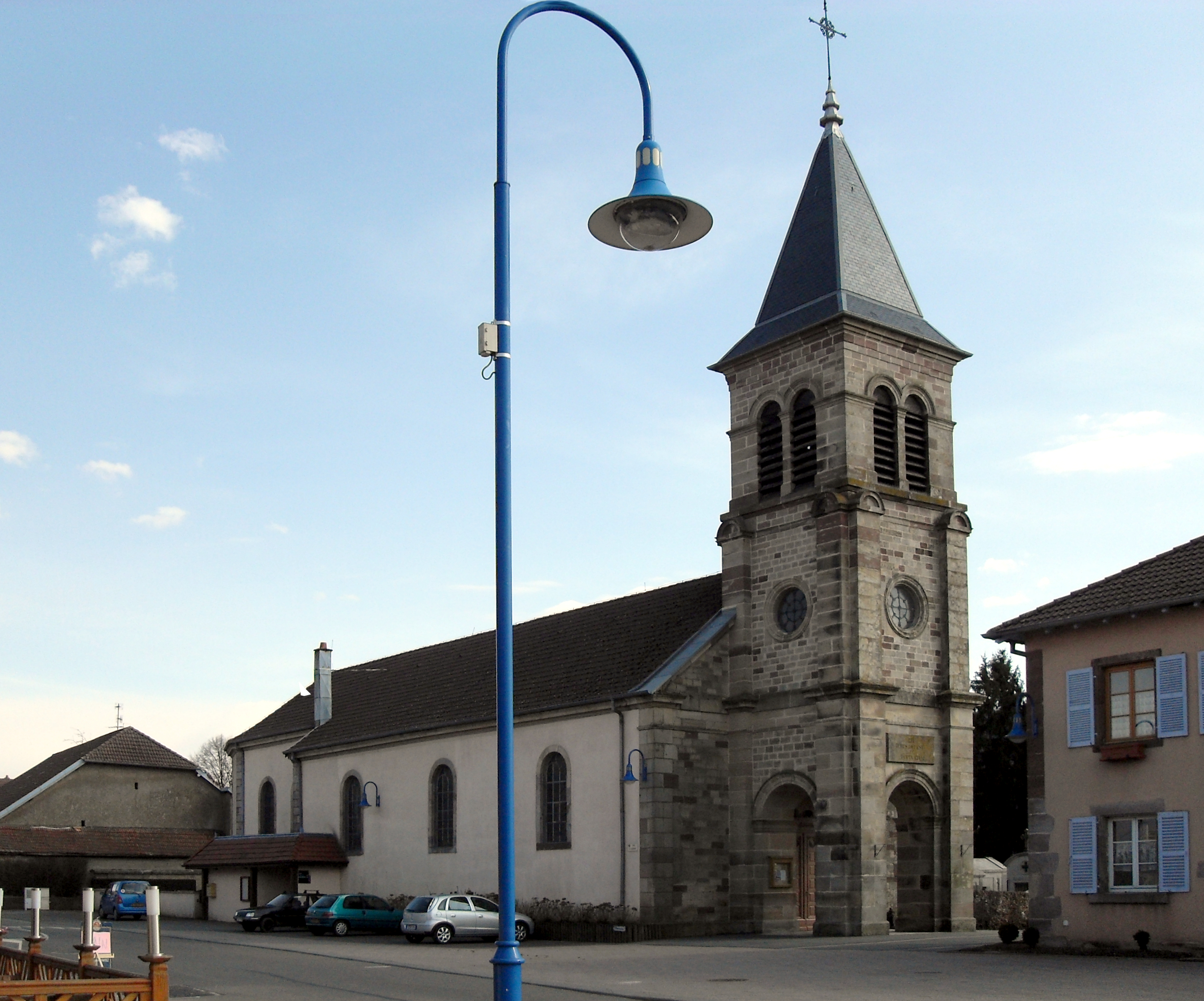
- Saint-Claude Church

- Coat of arms
- Location of Évette-Salbert
- Location within France Location within Bourgogne-Franche-Comté
- Coordinates: 47°40′33″N 6°47′56″E
- Country: France
- Region: Bourgogne-Franche-Comté
- Department: Territoire de Belfort
- Arrondissement: Belfort
- Canton: Valdoie
- Intercommunality: Grand Belfort

Government
  - Mayor (2021–2026): Laurent Demesy
- Area^{1}: 9.16 km^{2} (3.54 sq mi)
- Highest elevation: 474 m (1,555 ft)
- Lowest elevation: 382 m (1,253 ft)
- Population (2023): 2,029
  - Density: 222/km^{2} (574/sq mi)
- Time zone: UTC+01:00 (CET)
  - Summer (DST): UTC+02:00 (CEST)
- INSEE/Postal code: 90042 /90350
- ^{1} French Land Register data, which excludes lakes, ponds, glaciers > 1 km^{2} (0.386 sq mi or 247 acres) and river estuaries.

Évette-Salbert (French pronunciation: [evɛt salbɛʁ]) is a commune in the Territoire de Belfort department in Bourgogne-Franche-Comté in northeastern France. It was created in 1973 by the merger of the former communes Évette and Salbert.

== Population ==
Population data refer to the area corresponding with the commune as of January 2025.

Historical population
| Year | Pop. | ±% p.a. |
|---|---|---|
| 1968 | 883 | — |
| 1975 | 1,389 | +6.69% |
| 1982 | 1,781 | +3.62% |
| 1990 | 2,093 | +2.04% |
| 1999 | 2,155 | +0.32% |
| 2007 | 2,011 | −0.86% |
| 2012 | 2,106 | +0.93% |
| 2017 | 2,055 | −0.49% |
| 2023 | 2,029 | −0.21% |
Source: INSEE

== See also ==
- Lac de Malsaucy
- Communes of the Territoire de Belfort department
