= Offemont =

- Commune
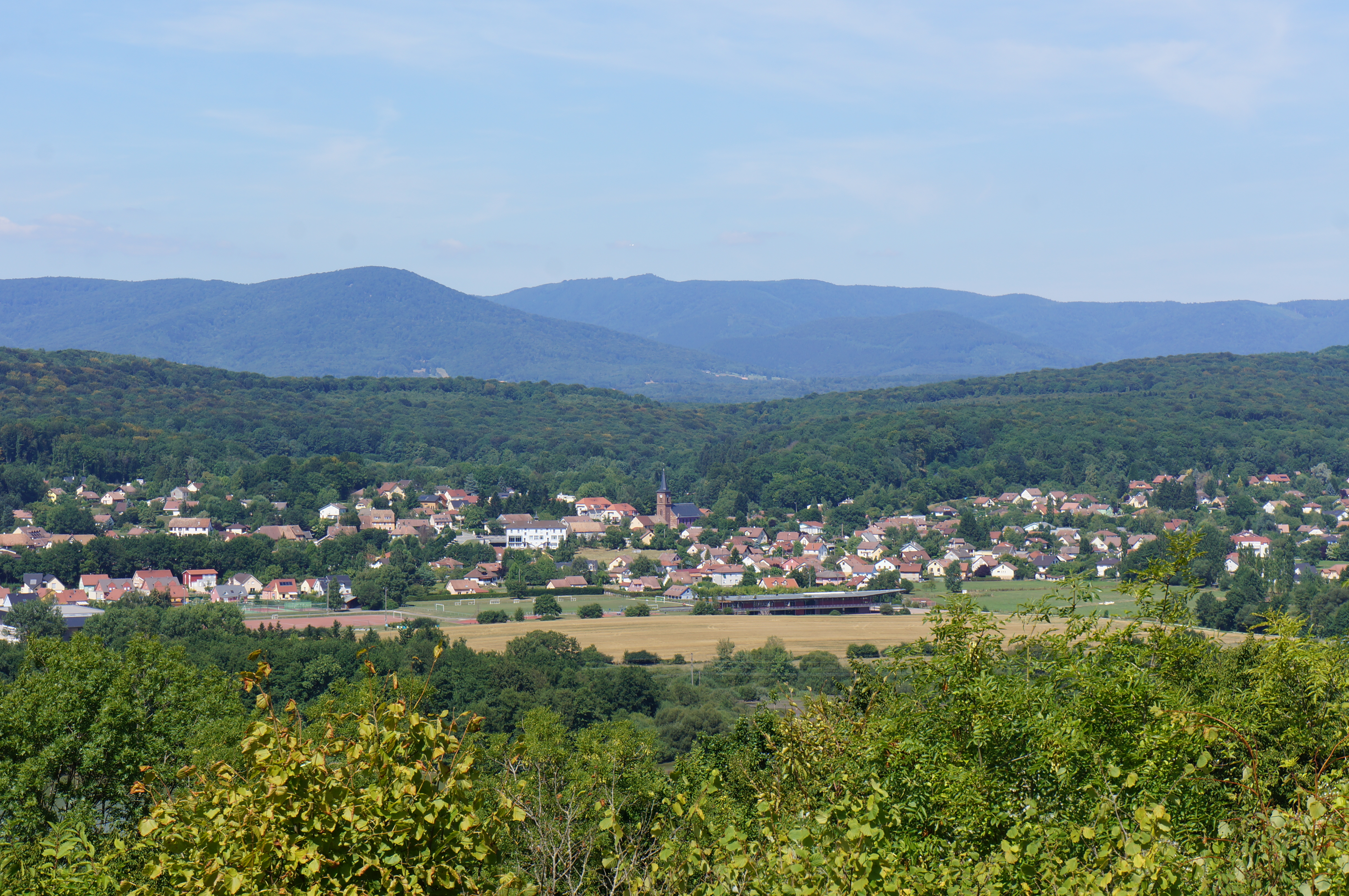
- General overview

- Coat of arms
- Location of Offemont
- Location within France Location within Bourgogne-Franche-Comté
- Coordinates: 47°39′51″N 6°52′42″E
- Country: France
- Region: Bourgogne-Franche-Comté
- Department: Territoire de Belfort
- Arrondissement: Belfort
- Canton: Valdoie
- Intercommunality: Grand Belfort

Government
  - Mayor (2020–2026): Pierre Carles
- Area^{1}: 5.55 km^{2} (2.14 sq mi)
- Highest elevation: 494 m (1,621 ft)
- Lowest elevation: 362 m (1,188 ft)
- Population (2023): 4,051
  - Density: 730/km^{2} (1,890/sq mi)
- Time zone: UTC+01:00 (CET)
  - Summer (DST): UTC+02:00 (CEST)
- INSEE/Postal code: 90075 /90300
- ^{1} French Land Register data, which excludes lakes, ponds, glaciers > 1 km^{2} (0.386 sq mi or 247 acres) and river estuaries.

Offemont (French pronunciation: [ɔfmɔ̃]) is a commune in the Territoire de Belfort department in Bourgogne-Franche-Comté in northeastern France.

== Population ==
Historical population
Year	Pop.	±% p.a.
1968	2,876	—
1975	3,456	+2.66%
1982	4,140	+2.61%
1990	4,213	+0.22%
1999	3,976	−0.64%
2007	3,360	−2.08%
2012	3,537	+1.03%
2017	4,108	+3.04%
2023	4,051	−0.23%
Source: INSEE

== See also ==
- Communes of the Territoire de Belfort department
