= Territoire de Belfort =

Department of France

- Department of France
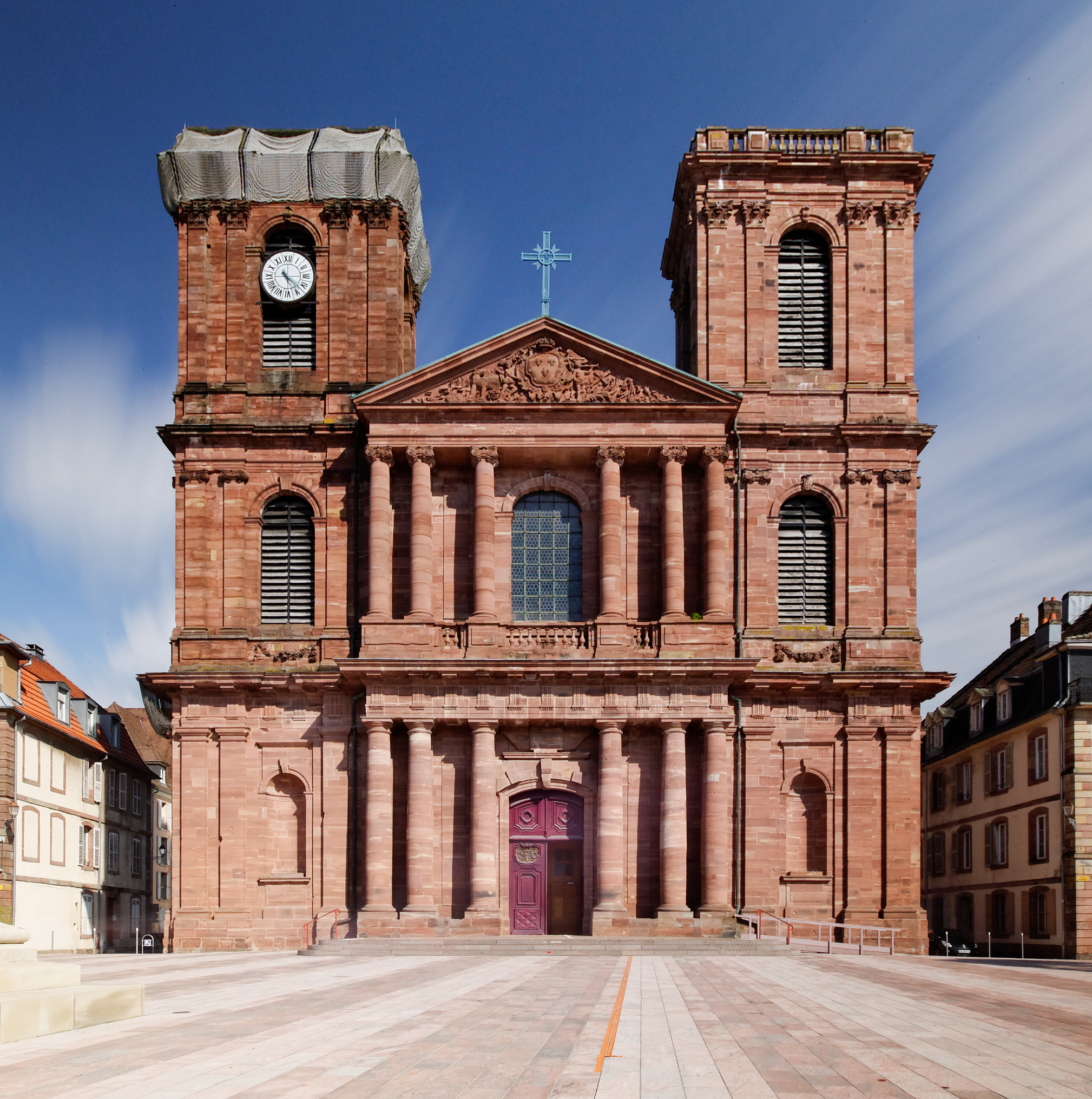
- Belfort Cathedral

- Flag Coat of arms

- Location of Territoire de Belfort in France
- Coordinates: 47°45′N 7°00′E
- Country: France
- Region: Bourgogne-Franche-Comté
- Prefecture: Belfort
- Subprefectures: None

Government
  - President of the Departmental Council: Florian Bouquet (LR)

Area^{1}
  - Total: 609.4 km^{2} (235.3 sq mi)

Population (2023)
  - Total: 140,255
  - Rank: 99th
  - Density: 230.2/km^{2} (596.1/sq mi)
- Time zone: UTC+1 (CET)
  - Summer (DST): UTC+2 (CEST)
- Department number: 90
- Arrondissements: 1
- Cantons: 9
- Communes: 101
- ^1 French Land Register data, which exclude estuaries and lakes, ponds and glaciers larger than 1 km^{2}

Territorial evolution of the departments in and around Alsace–Lorraine, showing the boundary of the 1871–1918 German Empire in yellow, separating the Territoire de Belfort (labelled 90) from the rest of Haut-Rhin (68)

The Territoire de Belfort (French pronunciation: [tɛʁitwaʁ də bɛlfɔʁ]; lit. "Territory of Belfort") is a department in the northeastern French region of Bourgogne-Franche-Comté. In 2023, the population was 140,255. The department, which spans a relatively small surface area of 609.4 km^{2} (235.3 sq mi), is situated just southwest of the European Collectivity of Alsace. It also shares a border with the Swiss canton of Jura to the southeast. Its prefecture is Belfort.

== History ==
The Territory is located in the historic Belfort Gap, also known as the Burgundian Gate. During the Migration Period of the 5th century, it was settled by Germanic people, the Burgundians and the Alemanni, who both inhabited the gap, with the Burgundians showing predominance in the region.

The administrative district of Territoire de Belfort was created under the terms of the 1871 Treaty of Frankfurt. The German Empire annexed almost all of Alsace. Still, the French were able to negotiate the retention of the Territoire de Belfort, which was thereby separated from the rest of Alsace (where it had been part of the department of Haut-Rhin). There were three principal reasons for this exceptional treatment:

- The population in and around Belfort was French-speaking.
- Belfort had demonstrated heroic resistance under Colonel Pierre Denfert-Rochereau against the German invasion. Belfort's left-wing Catholic Deputy Émile Keller now conducted a similarly forceful political campaign in the National Assembly. He argued that ceding heroic Belfort to Germany after the war would be unthinkable.
- Since Belfort is situated in a relatively flat passage between the Vosges and Jura mountain ranges (known as the Belfort Gap), the Germans agreed to leave the city in France, as Prussian military officers indicated that this strategy would give Germany a more defensible border.

After retaining its unique status as a territoire for just over half a century, Belfort was officially recognized as France's 90th department in 1922. Before, it was officially named the Arrondissement subsistant du Haut-Rhin ("Remaining Arrondissement of Haut-Rhin").

France had recovered Alsace three years earlier, but the decision was made not to reintegrate Belfort into its former department. There was talk of giving it a new departmental name, with suggestions that included "Savoureuse" (after the main river of the new department) or "Mont-Terrible" (the name of a former Napoleonic department embracing parts of Switzerland). Still, there was no consensus for a name change, and the department continues to be known as the Territoire de Belfort.

Belfort lies on the ridge that divides When the regions of France were created, Belfort was not included in the region of Alsace, but the adjacent region of Franche-Comté, since January 2016, Bourgogne-Franche-Comté.

The department do not have its own Cour d'assises but uses the one for the Haute-Saône.

== Geography ==
The department has an area of only 609 km^{2} (235 sq. miles), making it the fifth smallest of Metropolitan France (after Paris and its suburbs, Hauts-de-Seine, Seine-Saint-Denis, and Val-de-Marne). It is slightly smaller than Saint Lucia or Jakarta, Indonesia.

=== Principal towns ===
The most populous commune is Belfort, the prefecture, home to 33% of the department's population. As of 2023, there are 6 communes with more than 4,000 inhabitants:

Commune	Population (2023)
Belfort	45,912
Delle	5,623
Valdoie	5,175
Beaucourt	4,996
Bavilliers	4,678
Offemont	4,051

== Economy ==
The median net income per household for the department in 2017 was €21,310. The averaged figure for the Territoire de Belfort masked relatively large disparities, such as that between Belfort itself at €17,920 and Bermont at €26,600.

== Population and demographics ==
Historical population

Year	Pop.	±% p.a.
1872	56,781	—
1881	74,244	+3.02%
1891	83,670	+1.20%
1901	92,304	+0.99%
1911	101,386	+0.94%
1921	94,338	−0.72%
1931	99,403	+0.52%
1936	99,497	+0.02%
1946	86,648	−1.37%
1954	99,427	+1.73%

Year	Pop.	±% p.a.
1962	109,371	+1.20%
1968	118,450	+1.34%
1975	128,125	+1.13%
1982	131,999	+0.43%
1990	134,097	+0.20%
1999	137,408	+0.27%
2007	142,444	+0.45%
2012	143,940	+0.21%
2017	142,622	−0.18%
2023	140,255	−0.28%

Four principal phases can be identified in the population trends during the two centuries between 1801 and 2000.

- The period from 1800 to 1872 was marked by steady economic development and a relatively high birth rate. However, the cholera epidemic, which in 1851 arose from increasing urbanisation, along with a more general economic slow-down, reduced the rate of increase in the third quarter of the century. Between 1803 and 1872, the recorded population increased from 37,558 to 56,781.
- After the loss to Germany of most of Alsace in 1871, the Belfort population was boosted by the arrival of large numbers of refugees from "Germanisation": the years between 1871 and 1914 saw the development of large factories, with the mechanical and textile sectors being prominent growth areas. The population increase and the economic development were at their most intense in the Belfort conglomeration itself. By 1911, the territoire's population figure stood at 101,392.
- Between 1914 and 1945, the economic narrative was dominated by two world wars and the period of stagnation that came between them. The population declined, having dropped to 86,648 in 1946.
- After 1945, the region became a focus for industrial growth, with population levels following a similar rise trend, reaching 131,999 by 1982. Nevertheless, as in many parts of France, from about 1980 it became clear that the economic crisis of the 1970s was having a lasting effect, slowing the pace of expansion.

== Administration ==
Territorie de Belfort Map

Its departmental code is 90, and its prefecture (capital) is Belfort. There is a single arrondissement (Belfort), which is subdivided into 9 cantons and thence into 101 communes.

The cantons are:

- Bavilliers
- Belfort-1
- Belfort-2
- Belfort-3
- Châtenois-les-Forges
- Delle
- Giromagny
- Grandvillars
- Valdoie

== Politics ==
The president of the Departmental Council is Florian Bouquet, first elected in 2015.

=== Current National Assembly Representatives ===
Constituency	Member	Party
Territoire de Belfort's 1st constituency	Ian Boucard	The Republicans
Territoire de Belfort's 2nd constituency	Guillaume Bigot	National Rally

=== Current Senate Representatives ===
Constituency	Member	Party
Territoire de Belfort's Senate constituency	Cédric Perrin	The Republicans

== Tourism ==
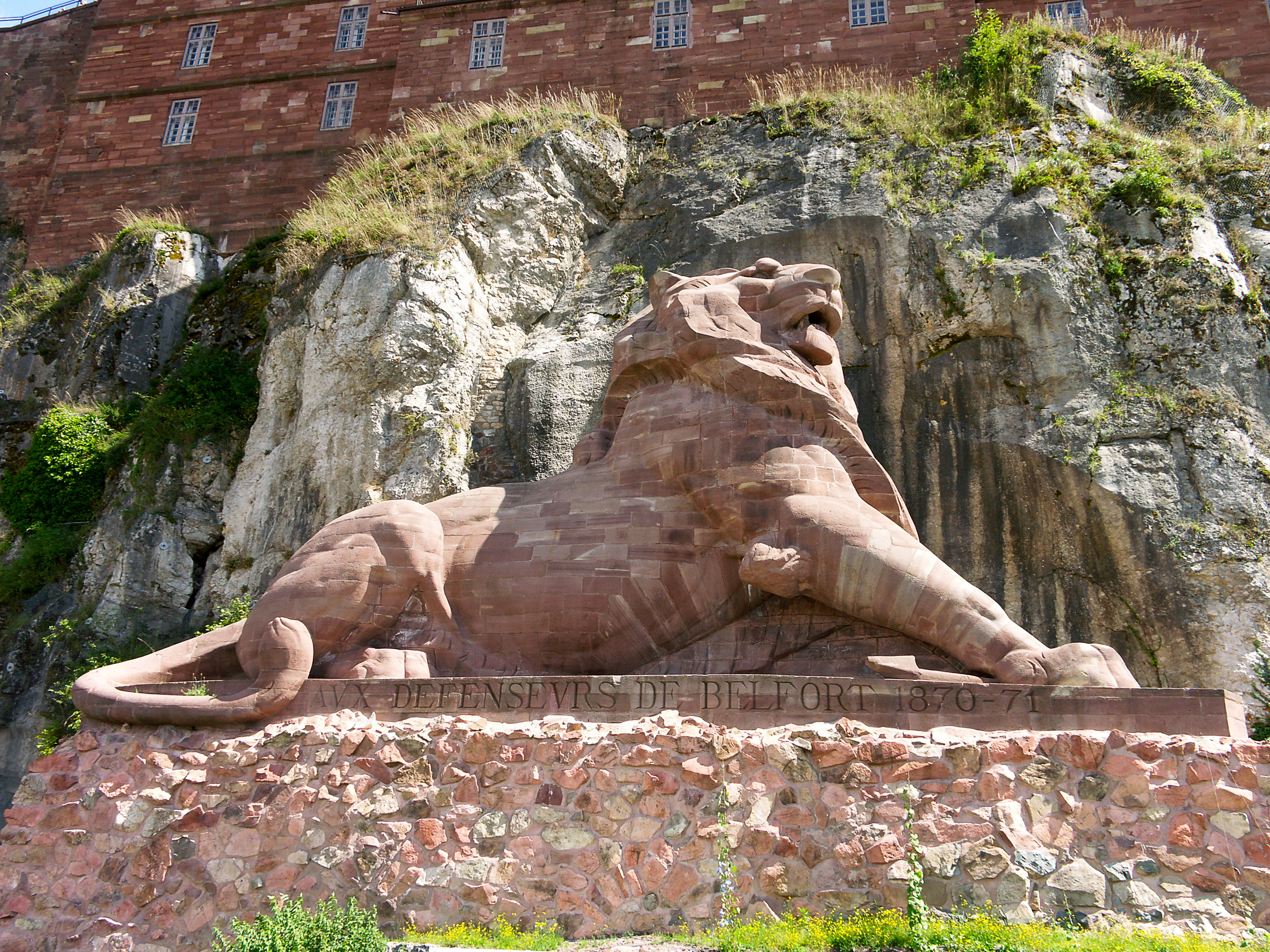
The Lion of Belfort commemorates the resistance of Belfort during the Franco-Prussian War.

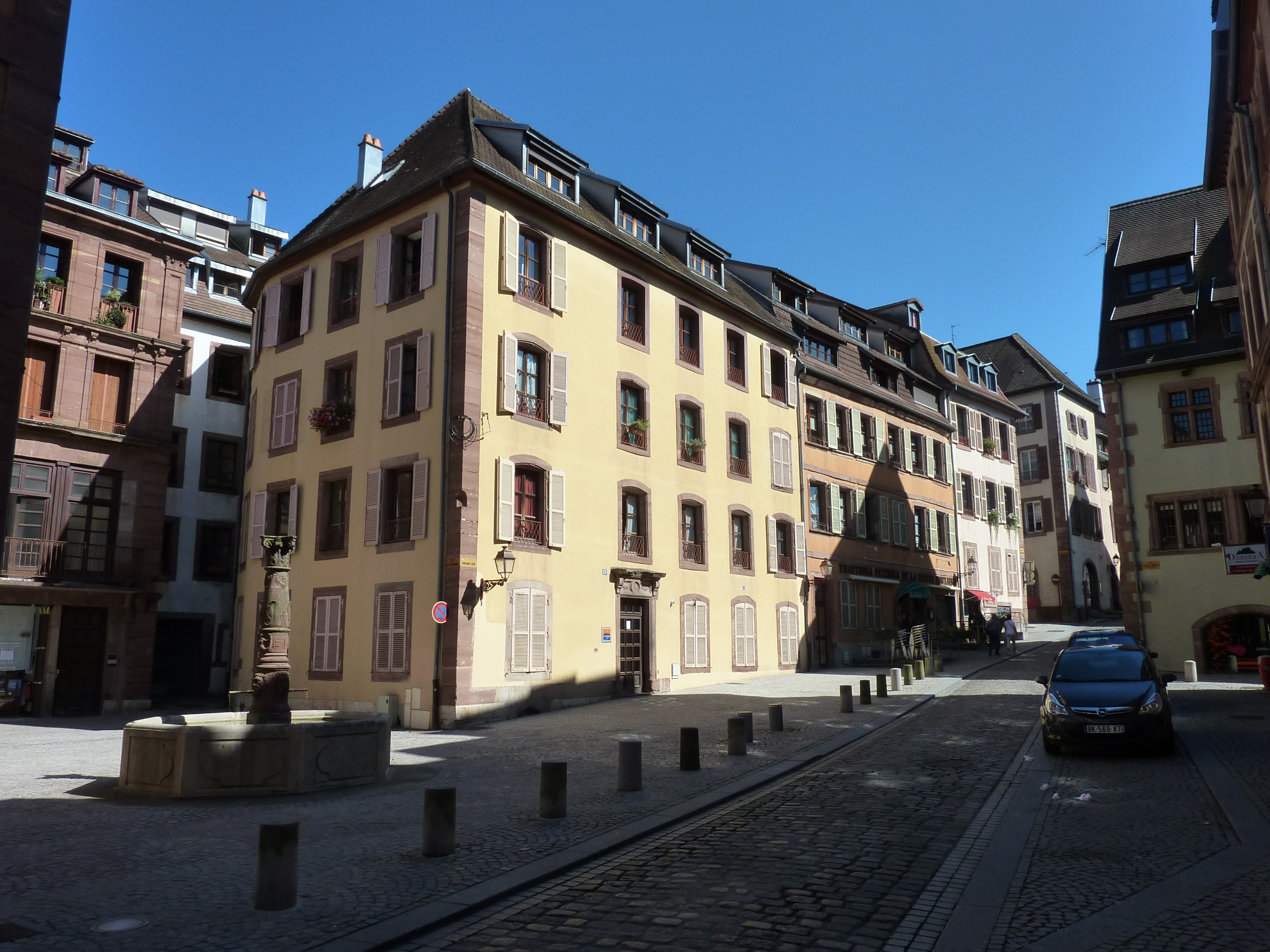
Streets in Belfort

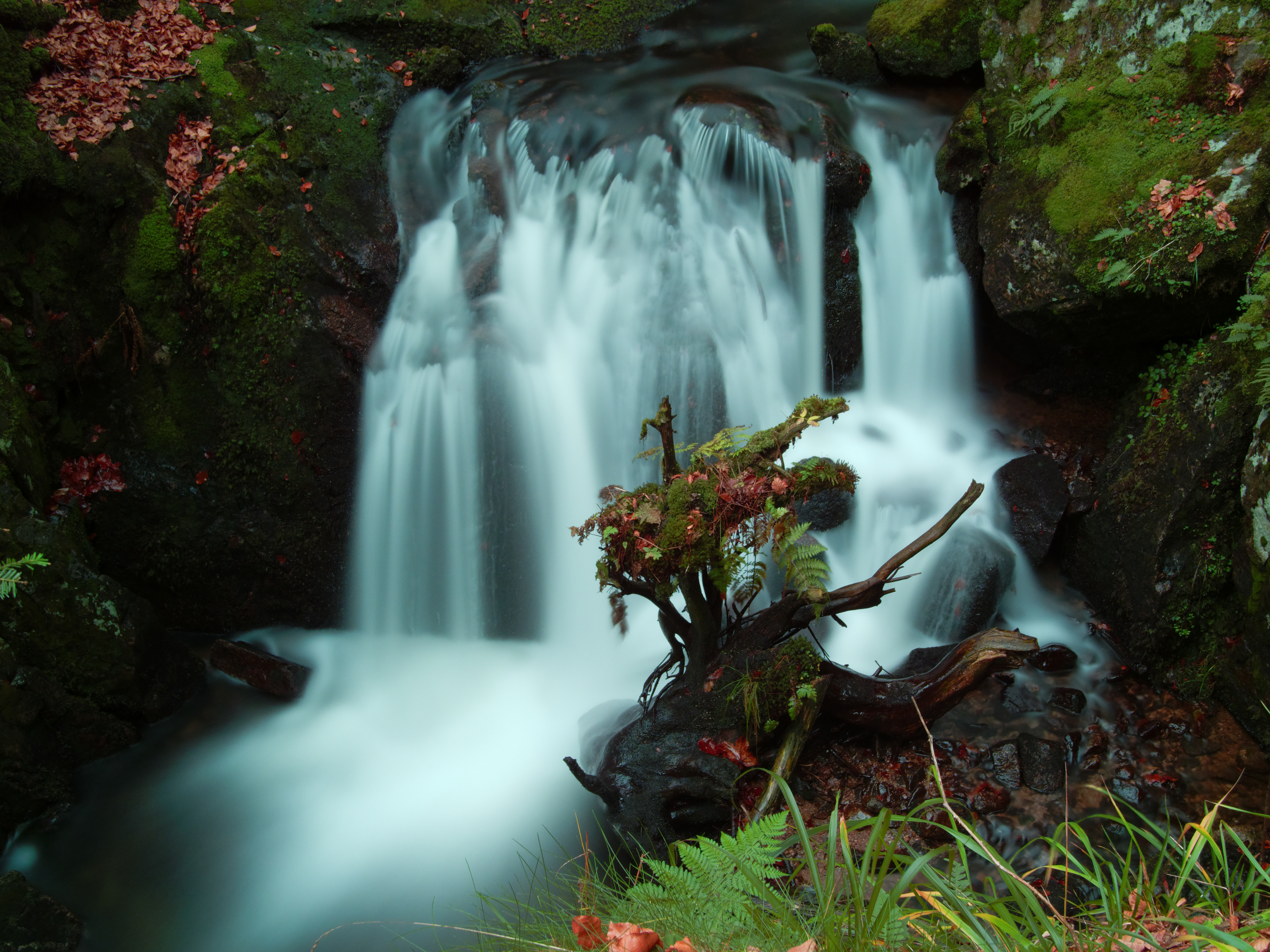
Cascade of the Savoureuse river

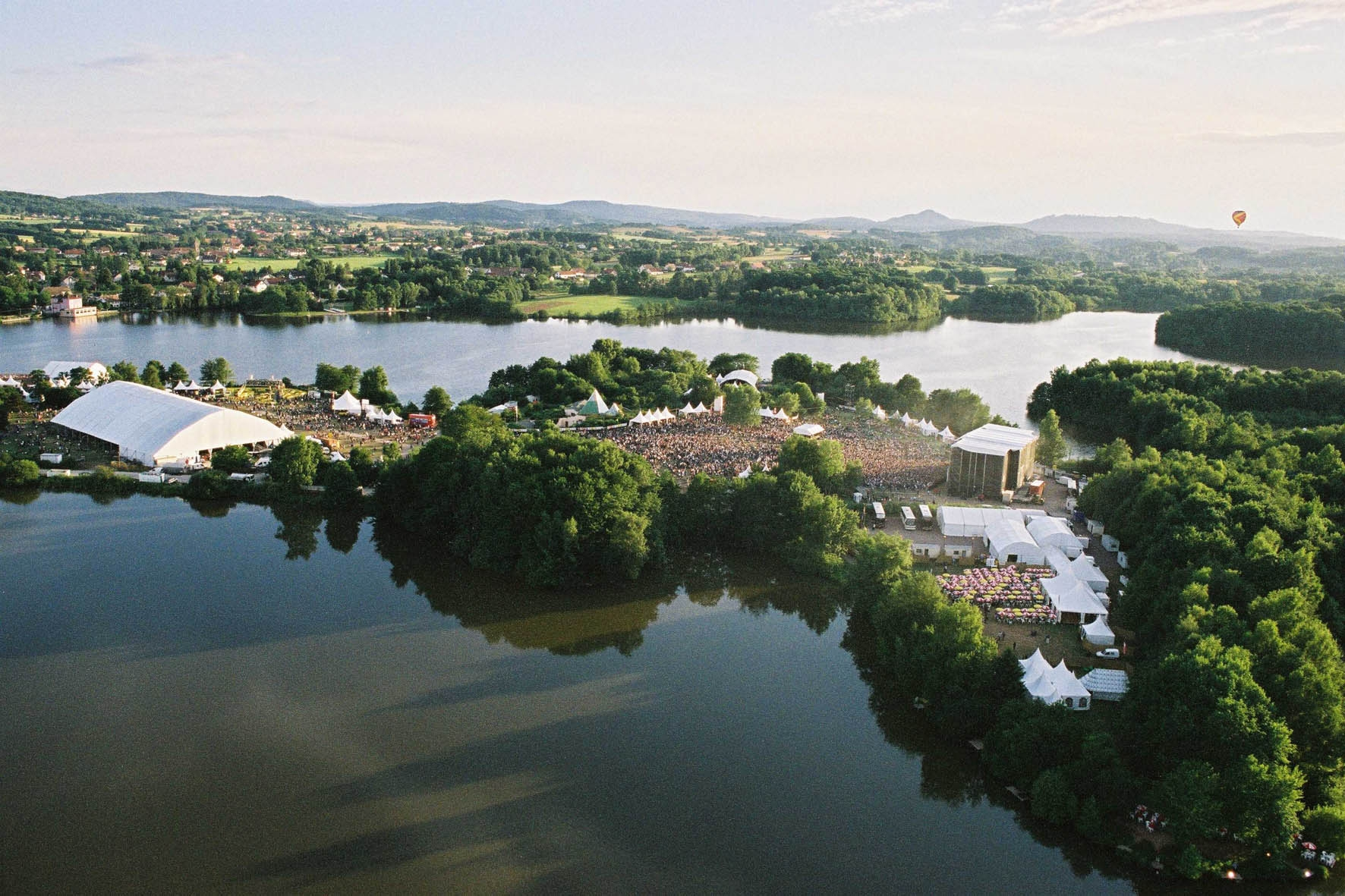
Eurockéennes music festival

== See also ==
- Communes of the Territoire de Belfort department
- Cantons of the Territoire de Belfort department
- Arrondissement of Belfort
