= Holbein (surname) =

Holbein is a surname of Germanic origin. It appears to mean "hollow leg" (Hol- + Bein); however, it could also have originally meant "hollow bone" or perhaps even have evolved from Holzbein, which could mean "wooden leg" or "wooden bone".

Some notable people with the surname include:

- Hans Holbein the Elder (1460–1524), German painter
- Hans Holbein the Younger (c. 1497–1543), son of Hans Holbein the Elder, court artist to King Henry VIII of England
- Ambrosius Holbein (1494–1519), German painter, son of Hans Holbein the Elder
- Sigmund Holbein (died 1540), German painter, brother of Hans Holbein the Elder
- Montague Holbein (1861–1944), British cyclist, runner-up of the first Bordeaux–Paris cycle race in 1891
- Therese Holbein von Holbeinsberg (1785–1859), Austrian landscape painter and etcher
- Thomas Holbein (born 1983), French footballer
- Ulrich Holbein (born 1953), German writer

== See also ==
- Hohlbein
