= Holbein =

Holbein may refer to:

- Holbein (surname)
- Holbein, Saskatchewan, a small village in Canada
- Holbein carpet, a type of Ottoman carpet
- Holbein stitch, a type of embroidery stitch
- Holbein (crater), a crater on Mercury
