= Alexander Toponce =

American pioneer

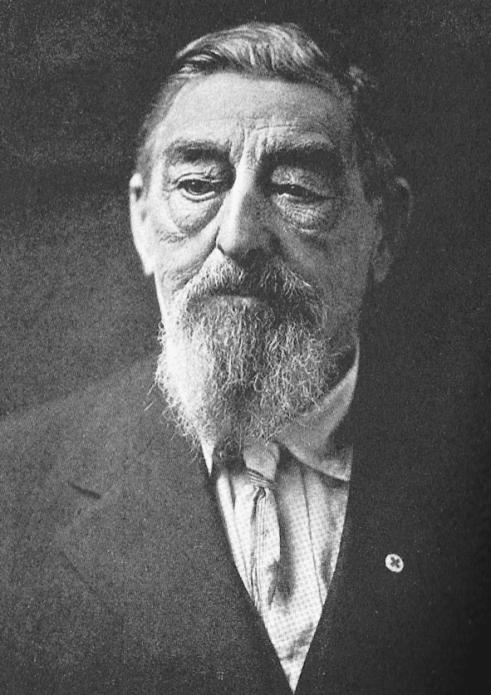
Alexander Toponce portrait

Alexander Toponce (November 10, 1839 – May 13, 1923) was an American pioneer in the Intermountain West region of the United States. His family immigrated to the United States from Belfort, France when he was seven and Alexander left home about three years later. He worked as a laborer for several years, mostly in the logging and lumber business, before becoming a teamster, stagecoach driver and freight handler. Toponce headed west when he was about fifteen years old, first to Missouri and then to the northern Intermountain West. There, he ran freight and stagecoach outfits, owned livestock herds, sometimes tried his hand at mining, and invested in all manner of development projects. He is credited with opening or improving many early freight and stage routes throughout the region. Later in life, he mostly invested in mining properties while holding interests in land development companies. Over his lifetime, Toponce made and lost several fortunes, the result of bad weather, Indian raids, unpredictable prices and dishonest partners.

Toponce knew, and was known to, a remarkable number and range of pioneers in Utah, Idaho, Montana, Wyoming and Nevada. In his heyday, he could obtain thousands of dollars in credit on little more than a word and a handshake. At the urging of friends, around 1919 he dictated his Reminiscences, which his wife published after his death. He kept no diary, so he spoke a great deal from memory, with some checking of other sources. A few of his dates are shaky, but Toponce did play a major role in the development of the upper Intermountain West. Moreover, he remained active until just a few months before his death, planning an irrigation and hydroelectric power project.

== Early life ==
Alexander Toponce was born in Belfort, France, a town located about ten miles from the border with Switzerland. In 1846, his father, Peter, moved the family to the United States. One of Alex's earliest memories concerned the large French stagecoach, known as a diligence, that took them through Paris to the port of Le Havre. Toponce said that, west of Paris, the diligence was unhitched from the team and lifted aboard a railway flatcar. The passengers got back in and the train carried them to the end of the rail line. According to the history of rail transport in France, in 1846 the tracks would have run as far as Rouen. There, the diligence was unloaded and hitched to a new team for the run into Le Havre.

Alex got his first lessons in English from sailors on the ship coming over, including “all the cuss-words in the language.” After their arrival in New York City, they took a packet up the Hudson River and linked with a boat on the Erie Canal. They finally settled in Jefferson County, New York. As the second son in the family, Alex found his prospects at home very poor. He attained a better situation chopping wood for another family in the county, a family he identified only as “Carmen.” Then he worked at a logging camp and sawmill for several years, also learning to handle a team of horses.

Around 1854, Toponce and one of the Carmen sons traveled west to near what would become the town of Tipton, Missouri. He gave no specific reason for this change. However, he had surely heard that the Pacific Railroad (later the Missouri Pacific Railroad) was then laying tracks across the state, headed for Tipton and beyond. They must have seen an opportunity to supply ties to the railroad and lumber for the towns likely to spring up along the route. So they leased a sawmill and began producing planks and timber.

There were apparently lulls in demand, because Toponce also found other work during this period. He made two trips to New Orleans to act as a French interpreter for a Tipton dealer in mules and Negro slaves. Toponce also made two trips as a “bullwhacker” on the Santa Fe Trail. He worked for the firm of Russell, Majors and Waddell, for a time the largest freight outfit in the West. A few years later, the company would operate the famous but short-lived Pony Express. Toponce also helped build stage stations that would later be used by the Butterfield Overland Mail. The Butterfield operation was authorized in late 1857 and began operation on September 15, 1858.

Warquartermaster==The Utah Expedition== By 1857, Toponce had moved further west as an assistant wagonmaster for Russell, Majors and Waddell, working under contract to the U.S. Army. This was after a couple months early in the year riding an express mail route out of Fort Kearny in Nebraska Territory. The transport firm had responded to an urgent request – order, actually – from the Army to assemble a massive supply train for a column headed to Utah. The expedition had been dispatched from Fort Leavenworth, Kansas to enforce Federal authority in Utah Territory. Among other changes, President James Buchanan planned to replace Brigham Young as governor of the Territory. Young was also president of the Church of Jesus Christ of Latter-day Saints, commonly known as the Mormons. After some early confusion, Colonel (later General) Albert Sidney Johnston was placed in command of the force. Although no actual battles were fought, the dispute came to be called the Utah War or the Mormon War.

On October 5, 1857, Mormon raiders burned most of the supply train while it was still eighty miles from Utah. Toponce later asked Lot Smith, the leader of the raiders, why he burned the supplies rather than hauling them back to Utah. Smith said they were afraid the Army would catch them, and that they were supposed to avoid any direct fighting. The lack of supplies and an early onset of bad weather forced the troops, and Toponce, to go into winter quarters. They had a miserable stay near the remnants of Fort Bridger, Wyoming, which the raiders had also burned.

During the Army's long wait for fresh supplies and better weather, cooler heads prevailed and were well on their way to a peaceful solution. When Johnston finally moved in early June, an agreement had been reached and the troops met no resistance. They then established Camp Floyd about thirty miles south of Salt Lake City. The force at Camp Floyd grew slowly, both to keep an eye on the Mormons and to protect the mail route to California.

Although the Army still required provisions and other equipment, they had much that was not needed and the contractor no longer had any use for the vast number of wagons and draft animals used when the troops were on the move. Thus, around October, they auctioned off much of that transport while Army quartermasters disposed of other surplus materials and supplies. Toponce himself bought a dozen army mules, many of which he sold at a profit even before he left Utah. He then returned to Missouri and rented a sawmill, which he operated until Abraham Lincoln was elected president.

== Mining in the West ==
Toponce and most of the men who worked in his sawmill were viewed locally as Northern sympathizers. He and two other men decided Missouri was no place for a Union man. They put together an outfit to hunt for pelts and scout the Colorado gold fields. At Colorado Springs, they heard of mining opportunities near where Breckenridge is today. Their claims produced “considerable money” in 1861, which emboldened them to build a mile-long flume to bring water to some new placer claims they had purchased. But the new sites proved short-lived and they lost most of their investment. Thus, in the fall of 1862 and early 1863, Toponce and his partners sold what they had left to James McNassar in Denver.

McNassar was well known in Denver and the Colorado gold country. Oddly enough, he was also a pioneer connected later with Corinne, Utah. Thus, in 1868, McNassar partnered with General Patrick Edward Connor to build the steamer Kate Connor (named for Connor's daughter) to haul supplies across the Great Salt Lake to and from Corinne. As Toponce recalled, the Kate was the first steamboat built to navigate the lake. He also states that he and his wife enjoyed an excursion on the boat, although his “early 80's” date recollection is incorrect, since the Kate was out of service by 1873.

From his Colorado venture, Toponce salvaged just two mules, three horses, a wagon and enough supplies for a long trip. A considerable train, with over 160 gold-seekers, had assembled in Denver and they elected Toponce to be their captain. Although he was just twenty-three years old, he had been doing a man's job for almost a decade. Despite the winter weather – they started in early February – everyone was anxious to reach the Montana gold fields, which they had heard were rich beyond anything in Colorado.

The train pointed north first, avoiding the higher ranges until they entered Wyoming Territory. Toponce then described a route that would have crossed the divide at Bridger Pass, a point about twenty miles southwest of the modern town of Rawlins, Wyoming. They joined the normal Oregon Trail route near Fort Bridger. The train generally followed the Trail until they were south of old Fort Hall, where they left the main route to head north. They crossed to the west side of the Snake River near the mouth of the Blackfoot River, using a ferry run by Jacob Meeks and John P. Gibson.

The train, which had grown to about 180 people, arrived at Bannack, Montana on May 14, 1863. Quite a few pioneers who were later prominent in Western development accompanied Toponce on this journey. Perhaps the most famous was Enos A. Wall, who was just a year older than Alex. Originally from North Carolina, Wall later successfully operated gold and silver mines in Montana, Idaho and Utah. In 1882, he served a term in the Idaho legislature. But Wall made his fortune in Utah copper mining, and later sold his holdings for $2.7 million. He died in 1920, three years before Toponce.

All the best ground around Bannack was claimed, so Toponce followed the rush to Alder Gulch, where Virginia City, Montana was soon founded. The returns from his Alder Gulch claim were very good, but not spectacular. Thus, in the fall he and Enos Wall packed supplies and their gold dust on two wagons and headed south to Utah.

== Hauling Freight ==
Shopping around near Salt Lake City, Toponce and Wall bought eight wagons with teams and stocked them with flour, tea, butter and mining tools. Alex also purchased a huge dressed hog from a butcher in Brigham City, Utah. The night time temperature quickly froze the carcass so it arrived in good shape when they got back to Virginia City on the day before Christmas. He had paid 6¢ a pound for the meat and butcher Alexander Metzel paid him a dollar a pound for it.

Metzel was another of the many men Toponce associated with who later became famous in the region. The butcher soon bought a ranch about fifteen miles from Virginia City and moved there full-time in 1872. Over the years, he greatly improved the breeds of his cattle and horses. He eventually owned one of the most prosperous livestock operations in Montana. Metzel also served three terms in the Montana legislature. He died in 1899.

Shortly after Toponce returned to Montana, the Montana Vigilantes began their efforts to suppress rampant crime. He apparently did not witness the execution of George Ives, but heard much about it. Then, having disposed of his goods and most of his teams, he headed south again. While Toponce took no part in the hangings, he considered them necessary. In fact, in his Reminiscences, he stated categorically that they had not done enough. He said that fully half of those who were only banished should have also been hung right then. In fact, many were hung later, when they began to prey on crews building the transcontinental railroad.

After a tough winter-time trip, Toponce led a new supply train to Montana in the spring of 1864. Turning that over during the summer, he tried to make another trip in the fall. However, he was delayed in getting started and ended up losing 175 head of cattle to bad weather. While not disastrous, the loss crippled his profits for the year. By then, gold had been discovered further north in what was called Last Chance Gulch. The resulting gold camp soon took the name Helena, Montana. So Toponce recouped some of his losses by hacking a road over a local divide to deliver the first large train of supplies for the miners there.

With Helena as a destination, Toponce looked for opportunities to haul freight from ports on the upper Missouri River. Fort Benton, Montana was the closest steamboat landing, but low water often blocked boat traffic to it. Alex's first contract called for him to haul government supplies from Fort Buford, over four hundred miles further down the river. His first venture went very well, with added profit from carrying supplies for the local Indian agent on into Helena.

His second trip, again with a government contract, also went well, except for one episode of potentially deadly danger. Toponce's initial success had attracted competitors, one of them being the Diamond R transport company. “Colonel” Charles Arthur Broadwater was manager of the Diamond R train. He had been known in Colorado and then in Virginia City before being appointed to lead the train.

At the time, he was also courting the young lady he would later marry, and Alex knew both of them. With their trains moving along well, Broadwater wanted to raced ahead, traveling only at night to avoid possible Indian parties. All went well until, not having seen any sign of Indians, they rode a leg during the day and ran into a considerable band. They put on a bold face, so the warriors only made them trade their outstanding saddle horses for a couple of scrawny scrubs. Broadwater later became a prominent leader in Montana politics (Broadwater County is named for him), railroad building and banking. He also promoted the famous Broadwater Hotel and Natatorium in Helena.

Toponce's third expedition for the government also did well, although they had to endure a serious Indian attack. However, he then tried a speculation on his own that ran afoul of even stronger Indian attacks and a severe blizzard. He began the venture with $75,000 in gold as well as his wagon train. When he finally returned to Helena in late June, 1866, he owned one mule and had to borrow $200 to pay off his men. But back in Salt Lake City, a local merchant persuaded him to buy, on credit, a train of twenty-six wagons that he had no further use for. Toponce then got further credit from the merchant to load the wagons with freight for Montana. The merchant made money and Toponce came away from the deal with plenty of cash for another venture.

During 1866–1867, Toponce took a flyer on eggs, buying them up all over northern Utah. Back in Montana, he sold them at a considerable profit to merchant George L. Shoup. Shoup later became one of the largest cattle ranchers in Idaho, the last governor of Idaho Territory and first for the new state, and then served as a U. S. Senator.

== Branching Out ==
By the summer of 1867, Toponce was well off again. But in a quest for self-sufficiency, Brigham Young had begun encouraging church members to trade only with Mormon merchants. That led to an actual boycott of Gentile stores in 1866, and had a dampening effect for several years. Many Gentile merchants that Alex had dealt with were left “holding the bag” on goods they could not sell.

Two of them, one being the Utah Territorial Governor Charles Durkee, approached Toponce for help. Alex bought a one-third interest in the goods and then peddled them to stores all over central Utah. Self-sufficiency might be good in theory, but these storekeepers simply could not pass up the chance. Mostly, he took cattle or local goods in trade since hardly anyone had much cash or even gold dust on hand. He ended up with about 6,000 head of cattle, which he and a crew then trailed into Nevada. He sold most of the cattle to a consortium of butchers who served the camps of the Comstock Lode. He also sold a pair of fine trotting horses to William Sharon, manager of the local Bank of California branch and later U. S. Senator for the state of Nevada. In May, 1868, Toponce settled up and returned to Salt Lake City. He and his partners figured they were good to the tune of $100,000 each.

With plenty of capital to work with, Toponce now began selling railroad ties, beef and other supplies to the Union Pacific. The eastern leg of the transcontinental railroad was then into Wyoming and would cross the Utah border in late 1868. Alex himself was there at the Golden Spike ceremony when the two leg met on May 10, 1869. In fact, he borrowed a shovel and threw some dirt on the ties for the final-day stretch “just to tell about it afterward.”

Having found ranching to his liking, Toponce went mainly into raising cattle and horses for the next five or six years. With a base in Garland, Utah, he filled beef contracts, and sold horses and mules to customers in southern Idaho down to Salt Lake City. Also, on September 18, 1870 Alex married widow Kate (Beach) Collins. Although later newspaper reports often said she was the first white child born in Utah, Toponce's Reminiscences explicitly say she was the fourth. Still, when he wrote his memoir, she was the oldest living white woman born in Utah.

Toponce counted many prominent leaders of the LDS church among his customers and suppliers. That included Brigham Young, whom he considered “the squarest man to do business with in Utah.” Others included Heber C. Kimball, one of the original members of the LDS Quorum of the Twelve; William Henry Hooper, Delegate to the U. S. Congress from Utah Territory; and John Taylor, who later succeeded Brigham Young as president of the church. Besides those, the notorious Porter Rockwell, frontier marshal and bodyguard to LDS founder Joseph Smith and Brigham Young, “took a fancy” to Alex. Yet despite his many contacts in the church, Toponce never became a Mormon himself.

Despite the preponderance of Mormons, Toponce had an eclectic blend of religious friends. He often rode in a stagecoach with Episcopal Bishop Daniel S. Tuttle, who later served as Presiding Bishop of the U. S. Episcopal Church. Alex was hugely impressed with Tuttle's common touch, recalling when he treated two fellow passengers, dancehall girls, as “queens in disguise.” Toponce was equally impressed by Methodist minister Thomas Corwin Iliff, later Trustee of the Iliff School of Theology in Denver.

In early 1871, Toponce entered into another joint venture to dispose of merchandise for a Gentile merchant. That exchange left them with over 9,000 head of Texas cattle on their hands, so Alex leased range on the Fort Hall Indian Reservation in Idaho. Toponce ran his Idaho cattle operation for about seven years before selling out to cattleman John Sparks. Sparks, with various partners, would eventually own one of the largest cattle operations in Idaho and Nevada. He would be elected to two terms as Nevada governor.

In yet another venture in 1873, Toponce and three partners built a canal from the Malad River south into Corinne. The canal mostly provided power for a grist mill in the town, although there was some flow left over for irrigation. Toponce and another set of partners also started a charcoal kiln in Wyoming, shipping the fuel to the lead-silver smelters operating east of Salt Lake City. In 1878–1881, the Utah and Northern Railway finally connected northern Utah with Butte, Montana. During the years of construction, the railroad steadily took business away from the animal-powered freight companies. Thus, over the course of the decade, Toponce had phased out that part of his business, although he continued to lease trains to other operators.

However, in 1879, major gold finds in Custer County, Idaho brought thousands of prospectors into the area. It also drew the interest of George Hearst, father of William Randolph Hearst. Toponce had known Hearst in connection with the Ontario silver mine in Park City, Utah. Although the Ontario eventually made a fortune for Hearst, the initial development costs severely strained his resources. Toponce was one of those who loaned him money when, as Alex put it, “the rent came round.”

Spurred by Hearst's interest, Toponce recruited some partners and built the first wagon road into the boomtown of Bonanza from Challis. He also established a stage line from Challis out to Blackfoot, providing a link with the railroad. Later, he opened a branch line to Bellevue. After three years, a competitor underbid him on the mail contract so he sold the business.

Toponce's venture in central Idaho led him back into mining, as he furnished “grubstakes” to hopeful prospectors. Of course, few such investments paid off in any big way, but Alex did have one or two good hits.

== Investor and developer ==
In 1883, to combine resources and reduce administrative costs, Toponce and four other investors formed the Corinne Mill, Canal and Stock Company. Alex's contribution included his interest in the Corinne canal and grist mill, as well as his ranch, including the livestock there. He was named vice president of the company. The president was a friend and business associate of Toponce's, going back to 1864. The company invested in land, some of which they developed slightly and sold, and some of which they used to expand their livestock herds. Trying to close one major land deal, they enlisted the help of Toponce's “very good friend,” Utah Governor Eli Murray. The governor hoped to encourage Gentile settlement of the area, but questions about water rights torpedoed the deal.

But in 1886, while Toponce and one other director were out of town, the president and the two other directors devised a subterfuge that dissolved the company in their favor. Since most of Toponce's assets had been tied up in the firm, he was essentially broke. And, after over seven years of litigation, so were the stock manipulators. Toponce won his case against them, but could collect only a $20,000 bond that had been posted early in the proceedings.

Meanwhile, Toponce's good credit and other assets kept him afloat. He started a new livestock operation and apparently handled a number of different construction and development projects. In 1887, he was elected mayor of Corinne, a job he handled with cleverness and good humor.

Within a few years, Toponce's investment in a mine near Shoup, Idaho provided a good return, although it did not become a long-time money-maker. Around the turn of the century, Toponce tried to make a splash with a big livestock deal. He bought up over 2,600 horses, plus 150 mules, in Nevada, paying rock-bottom prices because most of the animals were totally wild and poorly fed. He planned to drive them east into Nebraska or Kansas, moving slowly enough so they could fatten on the grassy plains. Along the way, they would be broken to riding and harness. “Broke” horses and mule were worth ten to fifty times what Alex had paid for them.

But Alex seems to have been seriously injured on this venture and, for a man of sixty years, the aftereffects may have been very serious. Toponce did not mention these events in his Reminiscences, but it was quite some time before his name appeared in the newspapers again.

Most of Toponce's projects in his final years involved irrigation and hydroelectric power. Thus, in 1920, a reporter marveled at Toponce's energy in pursuing a substantial water project at the age of eighty-one. That was about two years after Alex began dictating the Reminiscences for his wife to record. According to the original edition, he completed the effort before his eightieth birthday, but encountered obstacles in getting it published. Toponce continued to work on an irrigation project in Wyoming, but suffered heart problems in February 1923. He apparently never fully recovered and died on May 13, 1923.

== Legacy ==
Toponce Creek, located about twenty miles east of Pocatello, Idaho, was named for Alexander after he ranged cattle in the area.

His memoir is titled The Reminiscences of Alexander Toponce. A Google Scholar search for “Alexander Toponce” generated nearly sixty hits. The range of books and articles that cited his document includes several “Old West” histories, Episcopal Church history, mining history, Camp Floyd in Utah, vigilante activities, water resources, early freighting, and much, much more.
