= Hôtel de Ville, Belfort =

Town hall in Belfort, France

Hôtel de Ville
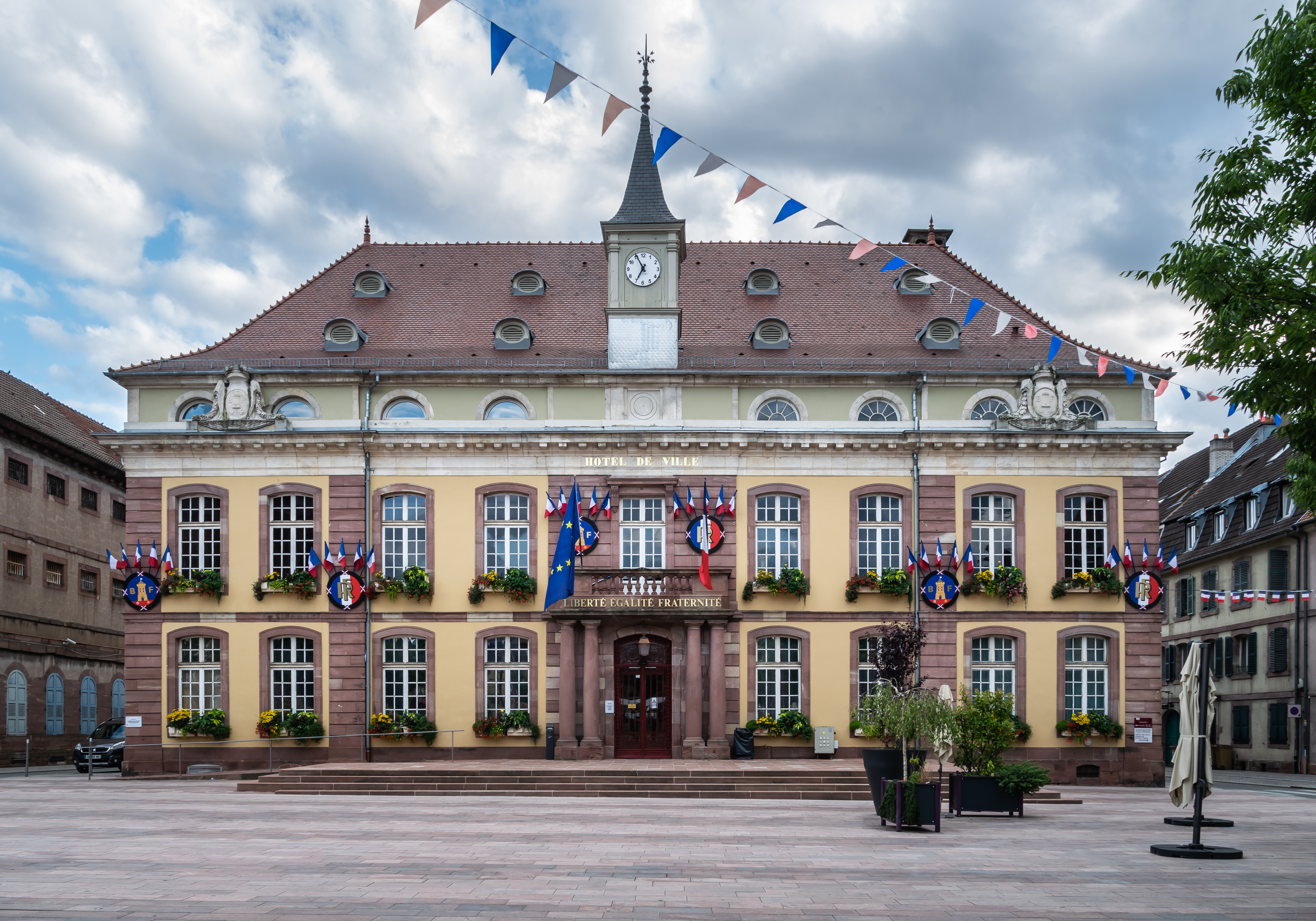
- The main frontage of the Hôtel de Ville in August 2019

General information
- Type: City hall
- Architectural style: Neoclassical style
- Location: Belfort, France
- Coordinates: 47.6379°N 6.8629°E
- Completed: 1724

Design and construction
- Architect: Jean-Baptiste Kléber

Monument historique
- Official name: Hôtel de ville
- Type: Inscrit
- Designated: 1922
- Reference no.: PA00101139

The Hôtel de Ville (French pronunciation: [otɛl də vil], City Hall) is a municipal building in Belfort, Territoire de Belfort, eastern France, standing on Place d'Armes. It was designated a monument historique by the French government in 1922.

== History ==
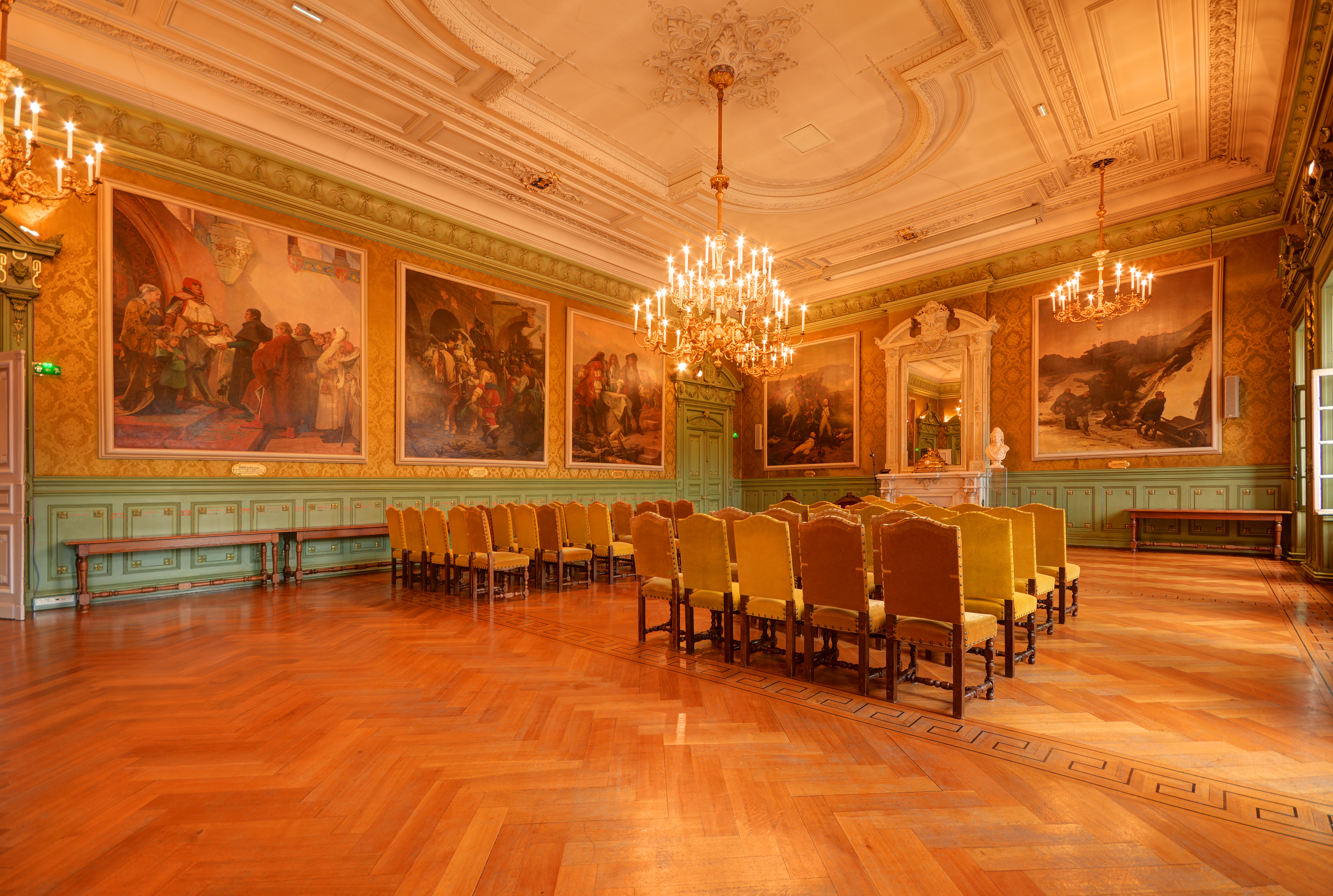
The Salle d'Honneur

Meetings of the aldermen were held in the Citadelle de Belfort (Belfort Castle) until the end of the 16th century. They relocated to a building referred to as the Ancien Hôtel de Ville (old town hall) near the Porte de Brisach (Brisach Gate) in 1602.

By the mid-18th century, the old town hall was inadequate, and the aldermen decided to find new premises. The building they selected was the Hôtel de Noblat, which was commissioned by Jean François Noblat, who was the local provost and bailiff. It was designed in the neoclassical style, built in red sandstone with a cement render finish and was completed in 1724. The aldermen acquired the building in 1785, and adapted it for municipal use to a design by Jean-Baptiste Kléber, who was the inspector of public buildings for the area.

The design involved a symmetrical main frontage of nine bays facing onto the central square (now Place d'Armes). The central bay, which was slightly projected forward, featured a segmental headed doorway framed by two pairs of Doric order columns supporting a balustraded balcony; there was a French door on the first floor. The other bays were fenestrated by segmental headed windows on both floors. There building also had an attic level, which was recessed and fenestrated with a series of Diocletian windows. There was a steep roof and a small clock tower rising from the front of the building, above the central bay. Internally, the principal rooms were Salle du Conseil (council chamber), now known as the Kléber room, on the ground floor, and the Salle d'Honneur (room of honour), which was created in 1810, on the first floor. The Salle d'Honneur was decorated with five paintings which depicted major events in the history of the town.

In the winter of 1870, during the siege of Belfort, part of the Franco-Prussian War, many buildings were damaged by the attacking Prussian forces, but the town hall survived. Following the liberation of the town by troops of the French First Army on 20 November 1944, during the Second World War, the mayor, Hubert Metzger, greeted and gave his thanks to the first French soldier to reach the town hall in the late afternoon.

In the 1980s, the town council acquired a former French Army mess, located one block to the west of the town hall, on Rue de l'Ancien-Théâtre, and converted it into an annex for the town hall. Since then, council meetings have been held in the Olivier Barillot room in the annex. In November 2024, the council announced that the annex would be refurbished at a cost of €2.5 million to a design by LAO Architectes.
