= John Glélé =

Beninese footballer (born 1986)

Personal information
- Date of birth: 19 February 1986 (age 40)
- Place of birth: Belfort, France
- Height: 1.83 m (6 ft 0 in)
- Position: Left-back

Senior career*
Years	Team	Apps	(Gls)
2004–2005	Guingamp B	25	(0)
2005–2006	Amiens B	26	(0)
2007	Cowdenbeath	0	(0)
2007–2008	ASM Belfort	7	(0)
2008–2010	APEP Pitsilia	28	(1)
2010–2011	Aris Limassol	13	(0)
2012	Black Stars Basel	6	(0)
2012–2015	ASM Belfort		
2015	FC Porrentruy	7	(0)
2016	FC Courtételle		

International career
2009	Benin	2	(0)
- * Club domestic league appearances and goals

John Glélé (born 19 February 1986) is a former professional footballer who played as a left-back. Born in France, he played for the Benin national team internationally, making two appearances in 2009.

== Club career ==
Glélé began his career with EA Guingamp B and was in 2005 transferred to Amiens SC B. He left the club in 2007, playing the first half of the 2007–08 season for Cowdenbeath F.C. and the second half for ASM Belfort. On 30 January 2008, he signed a contract with Cypriot First Division team APEP Pitsilia.

== International career ==
On 11 February 2009, Glélé made his debut for the Benin national team in a friendly against Algeria.
