= Belfort =

Belfort Béfoûe (Frainc-Comtou)
- Prefecture and commune
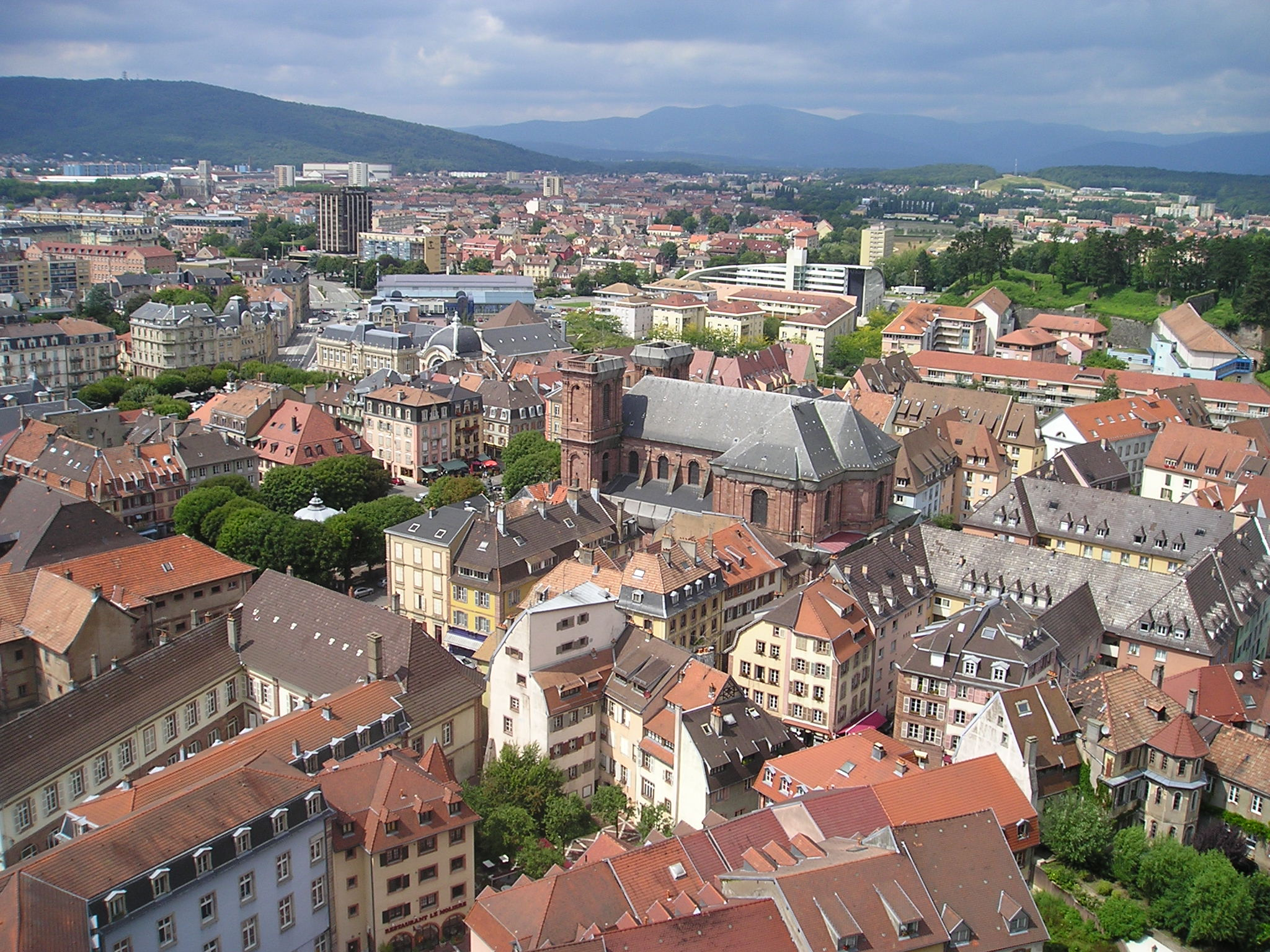
- An aerial view of Belfort with the Cathedral of Saint-Christophe in the foreground

- Coat of arms
- Location of Belfort
- Location within France Location within Bourgogne-Franche-Comté
- Coordinates: 47°38′N 6°51′E
- Country: France
- Region: Bourgogne-Franche-Comté
- Department: Territoire de Belfort
- Arrondissement: Belfort
- Canton: 3 cantons
- Intercommunality: CA Grand Belfort

Government
  - Mayor (2020–2026): Damien Meslot
- Area^{1}: 17.10 km^{2} (6.60 sq mi)
  - Urban: 106.8 km^{2} (41.2 sq mi)
  - Metro: 633.2 km^{2} (244.5 sq mi)
- Elevation: 358 m (1,175 ft)
- Highest elevation: 650 m (2,130 ft)
- Lowest elevation: 354 m (1,161 ft)
- Population (2023): 45,912
  - Density: 2,685/km^{2} (6,954/sq mi)
  - Urban (2022): 77,926
  - Urban density: 729.6/km^{2} (1,890/sq mi)
  - Metro (2022): 131,807
  - Metro density: 208.2/km^{2} (539.1/sq mi)
- Time zone: UTC+01:00 (CET)
  - Summer (DST): UTC+02:00 (CEST)
- INSEE/Postal code: 90010 /90000
- Dialling codes: 0384
- ^{1} French Land Register data, which excludes lakes, ponds, glaciers > 1 km^{2} (0.386 sq mi or 247 acres) and river estuaries.

Belfort (French pronunciation: [bɛlfɔʁ]; archaic German: Beffert, Beffort; Frainc-Comtou: Béfoûe) is a city in northeastern France, situated approximately 25 km (16 mi) from the Swiss border. It is the prefecture of the Territoire de Belfort.

Belfort is 400 km (250 mi) from Paris and 55 km (34 mi) from Basel. The residents of the city are called "Belfortains". The city is located on the river Savoureuse, on a strategically important natural route between the Rhine and the Rhône – the Belfort Gap (Trouée de Belfort) or Burgundian Gate (Porte de Bourgogne). It is located approximately 16 km (10 mi) south from the base of the Ballon d'Alsace mountain range, source of the Savoureuse. The city of Belfort has 45,646 inhabitants (2022), and is the centre of a larger functional area (metropolitan area) with 131,807 inhabitants (2022), between the larger metropolitan areas of Mulhouse and Montbéliard.

== History ==
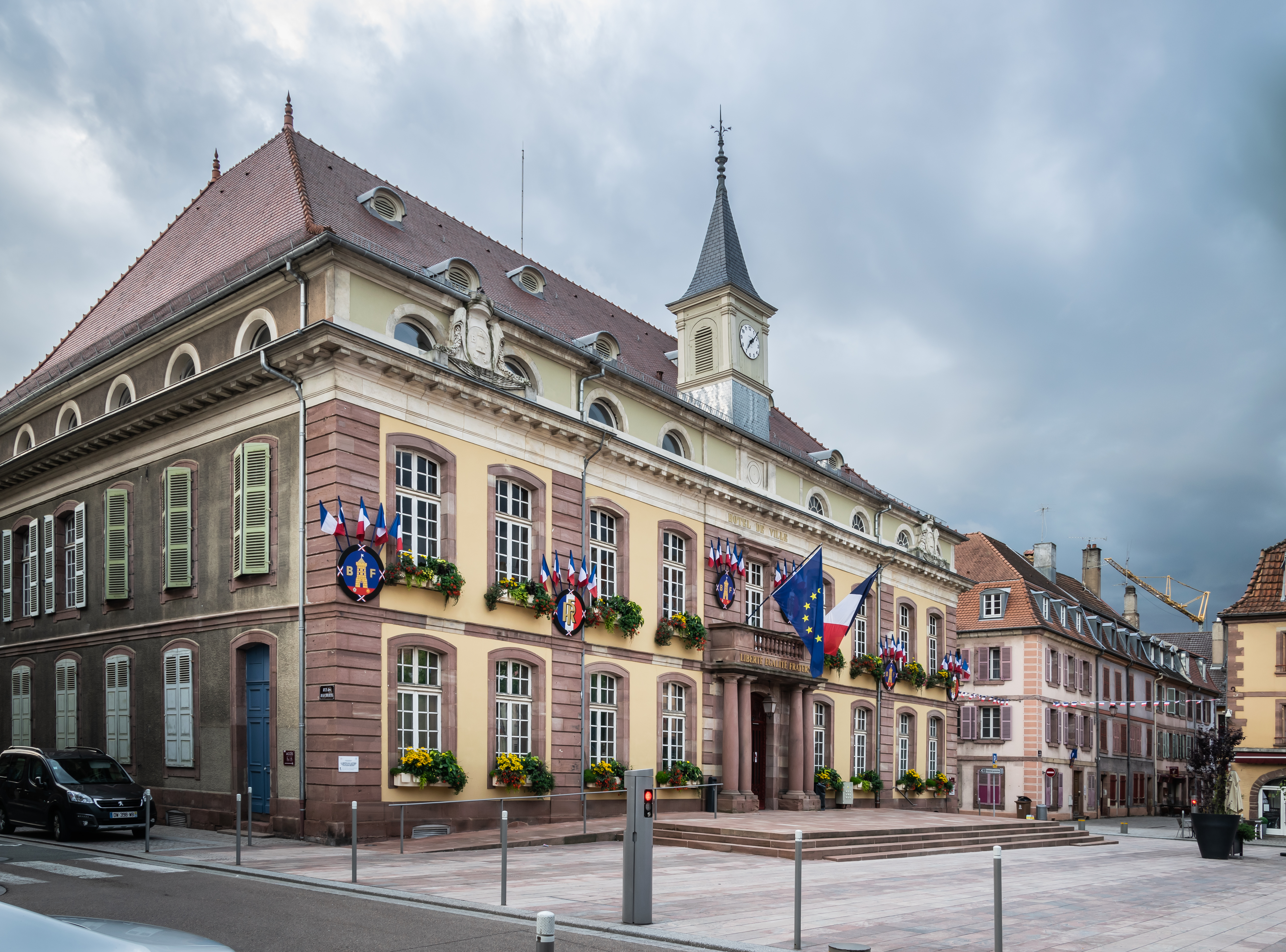
The Hôtel de Ville

Map of Belfort (around 1750)

=== Early history ===
Belfort's strategic location, in a natural gap between the Vosges and the Jura, on a route linking the Rhine and the Rhône, has attracted human settlement since Roman times, and has also made it a frequent target for invading armies many times in its history.

During the Migration Period of the 5th century, it was heavily settled by Germanic peoples, the Burgundians and the Alemanni, who shared the gap, with the Burgundians showing the most predominance in the region. It was subsequently recorded in the 13th century as a possession of the counts of Montbéliard, who granted it a charter in 1307.

Due to the devastation of the 30 years war, about half of the population of Belfort had perished. Due to this, immediately after the war, many German families from neighboring regions settled in and repopulated Belfort.

Previously an Austrian possession, Belfort was transferred to France by the Treaty of Westphalia (1648), which ended the Thirty Years' War. The town's fortifications were extended and developed by the military architect Vauban for Louis XIV. The Hôtel de Ville was completed in 1724.

=== Franco-Prussian War ===
Until 1871, Belfort was part of the département of Haut-Rhin, in Alsace. The Siege of Belfort (between 3 November 1870 and 18 February 1871) during the Franco-Prussian War was successfully resisted by the French until the garrison was ordered to surrender 21 days after the armistice between France and Prussia ended the war. The region was not annexed by Prussia like the rest of Alsace was. It was exchanged for territories in the vicinity of Metz. It formed, as it still does, the Territoire de Belfort. The siege is commemorated by a huge statue, the Lion of Belfort, by Frédéric Bartholdi. Alsatians not wanting to live under German rule in annexed Alsace and who wanted a French life and home in Belfort made a significant contribution to Belfort and French industry (see Société Alsacienne de Constructions Mécaniques) after 1872.

=== 1892 Paris-Belfort running race ===
On 5 June 1892, Le Petit Journal organised a foot-race from Paris to Belfort, a course of over 380 km (240 mi), the first large-scale long-distance running race on record. Over 1,100 competitors registered for the event and over 800 started from the offices of Le Petit Journal, at Paris Opera. This had also been the start point for the inaugural Paris–Brest–Paris cycle-race the previous year. The newspaper's circulation dramatically increased as the French public followed the progress of race participants, 380 of whom completed the course in under ten days. In Le Petit Journal on 18 June 1892, Pierre Giffard praised the event as a model for the physical training of a nation faced by hostile neighbours. The event was won by Constant Ramoge in 100 hours, 5 minutes.

=== Ère des attentats (1892-1894) ===
During the repression of January and February 1894, the police conducted raids targeting the anarchists living there, without much success.

=== World War I ===
The town was bombarded by the German Army during World War I. Before the war, the September Programme of German Imperial Chancellor Theobald von Bethmann Hollweg, pressed for expansionist aims of French territory, specifically advocated the annexation of the Belfort region along with the western side of the Vosges Mountains.

=== World War II ===
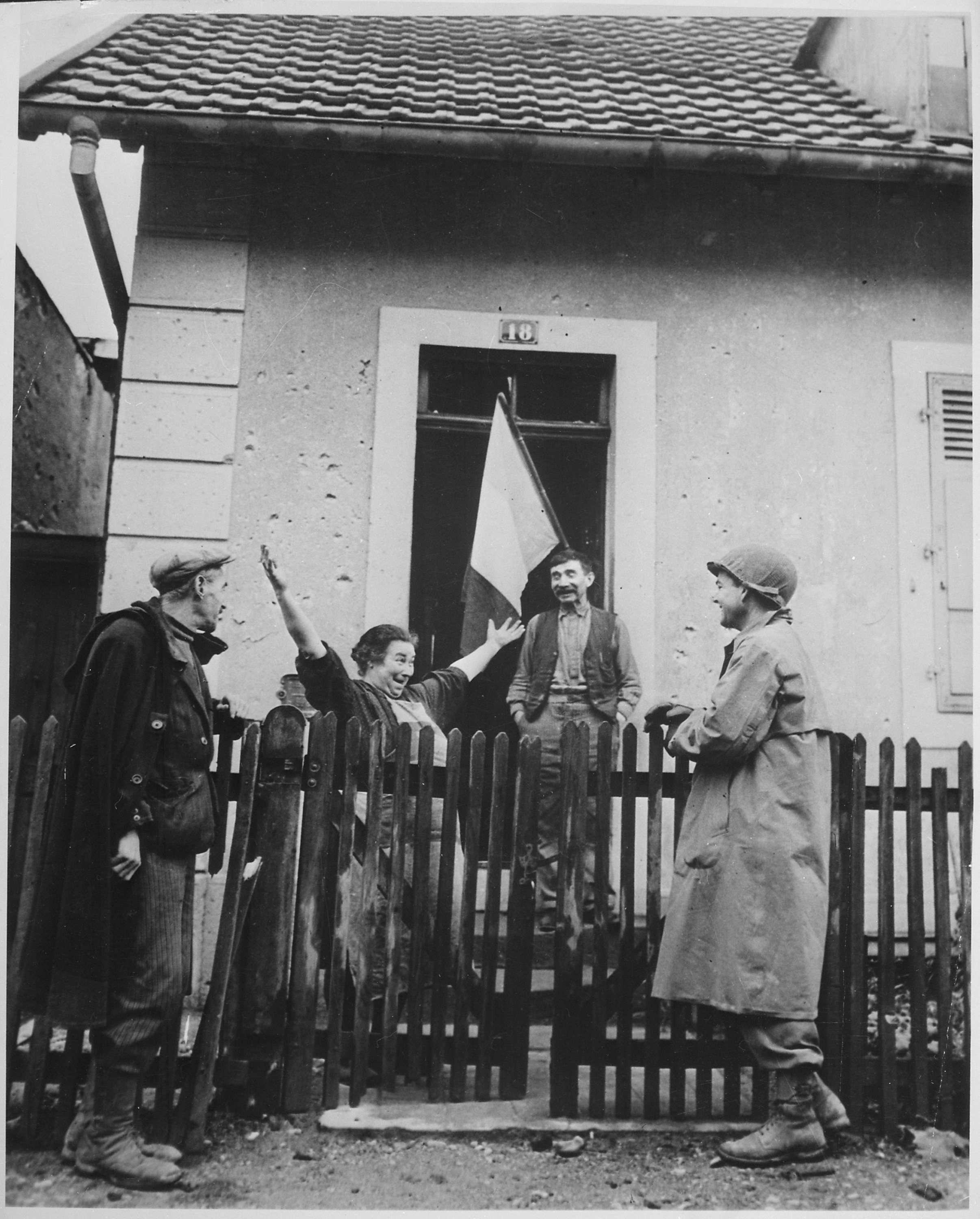
25 November 1944: a French woman exclaims to a neighbor and American soldier: "Tout Belfort est libre" (All Belfort is free).

After the 1940 Battle of France with the German victory, Belfort fell within the Nazi German occupation zone. On 15 August 1944, US troops and troops of the French Liberation Army began the Provence Landing. They advanced quickly through the Rhone valley and Wehrmacht troops quickly retreated.
In November 1944, the Wehrmacht held off the French First Army outside the town until French Commandos made a successful night attack on the Salbert Fort. Belfort was liberated on 22 November 1944. It is believed that Adolf Hitler intended to annex Belfort into the German Gau Baden–Alsace, but it never took place.

== Geography ==
=== Climate ===
Belfort has an oceanic climate (Köppen climate classification Cfb). The average annual temperature in Belfort is 10.1 °C (50.2 °F). The average annual rainfall is 1,122.3 mm (44.19 in) with December as the wettest month. The temperatures are highest on average in July, at around 19.2 °C (66.6 °F), and lowest in January, at around 1.2 °C (34.2 °F). The highest temperature ever recorded in Belfort was 38.0 °C (100.4 °F) on 13 July 1949; the coldest temperature ever recorded was −21.4 °C (−6.5 °F) on 10 February 1956.

Comparison of local Meteorological data with other cities in France
Town	Sunshine (hours/yr)	Rain (mm/yr)	Snow (days/yr)	Storm (days/yr)	Fog (days/yr)
National average	1,973	770	14	22	40
Belfort	N/A	1,121.2	30.6	25.9	41.8
Paris	1,661	637	12	18	10
Nice	2,724	767	1	29	1
Strasbourg	1,693	665	29	29	56
Brest	1,605	1,211	7	12	75

Climate data for Belfort (1981–2010 averages, extremes 1946−2013)
Month	Jan	Feb	Mar	Apr	May	Jun	Jul	Aug	Sep	Oct	Nov	Dec	Year
Record high °C (°F)	16.9 (62.4)	20.4 (68.7)	25.2 (77.4)	29.0 (84.2)	32.1 (89.8)	35.0 (95.0)	38.0 (100.4)	37.5 (99.5)	34.0 (93.2)	27.5 (81.5)	20.3 (68.5)	18.2 (64.8)	38.0 (100.4)
Mean daily maximum °C (°F)	3.8 (38.8)	5.7 (42.3)	10.3 (50.5)	14.3 (57.7)	18.8 (65.8)	22.1 (71.8)	24.5 (76.1)	24.2 (75.6)	19.6 (67.3)	14.6 (58.3)	8.1 (46.6)	4.5 (40.1)	14.3 (57.7)
Daily mean °C (°F)	1.2 (34.2)	2.3 (36.1)	6.1 (43.0)	9.4 (48.9)	13.8 (56.8)	16.9 (62.4)	19.2 (66.6)	18.9 (66.0)	15.0 (59.0)	10.7 (51.3)	5.2 (41.4)	2.1 (35.8)	10.1 (50.2)
Mean daily minimum °C (°F)	−1.5 (29.3)	−1.1 (30.0)	1.9 (35.4)	4.6 (40.3)	8.7 (47.7)	11.7 (53.1)	13.8 (56.8)	13.6 (56.5)	10.3 (50.5)	6.9 (44.4)	2.3 (36.1)	−0.4 (31.3)	5.9 (42.6)
Record low °C (°F)	−20.6 (−5.1)	−21.4 (−6.5)	−14.1 (6.6)	−6.1 (21.0)	−3.7 (25.3)	1.7 (35.1)	4.6 (40.3)	4.4 (39.9)	0.3 (32.5)	−6.0 (21.2)	−10.1 (13.8)	−16.7 (1.9)	−21.4 (−6.5)
Average precipitation mm (inches)	97.6 (3.84)	86.6 (3.41)	88.7 (3.49)	71.8 (2.83)	100.9 (3.97)	85.7 (3.37)	81.4 (3.20)	88.1 (3.47)	96.0 (3.78)	106.0 (4.17)	99.4 (3.91)	120.1 (4.73)	1,122.3 (44.19)
Average precipitation days (≥ 1.0 mm)	12.3	11.1	12.3	10.8	13.0	11.0	10.4	10.6	9.8	11.9	12.2	13.4	138.9
Source: Météo France

== Population ==
Historical population

Year	Pop.	±% p.a.
1793	4,593	—
1800	4,400	−0.61%
1806	4,210	−0.73%
1821	4,738	+0.79%
1831	5,753	+1.96%
1836	5,687	−0.23%
1841	5,617	−0.25%
1846	6,664	+3.48%
1851	7,847	+3.32%
1856	7,510	−0.87%
1861	8,101	+1.53%
1866	8,400	+0.73%
1872	8,030	−0.75%
1876	15,173	+17.24%
1881	19,336	+4.97%
1886	22,181	+2.78%
1891	25,455	+2.79%
1896	28,715	+2.44%
1901	32,567	+2.55%

Year	Pop.	±% p.a.
1906	34,649	+1.25%
1911	39,371	+2.59%
1921	39,301	−0.02%
1926	40,516	+0.61%
1931	42,511	+0.97%
1936	45,625	+1.42%
1946	37,387	−1.97%
1954	43,434	+1.89%
1962	48,070	+1.28%
1968	53,214	+1.71%
1975	54,615	+0.37%
1982	51,206	−0.92%
1990	50,125	−0.27%
1999	50,417	+0.06%
2007	51,327	+0.22%
2012	50,102	−0.48%
2017	47,656	−1.00%
2023	45,912	−0.62%

Source: EHESS and INSEE (1968-2023)

== Economy ==
Belfort is a centre for heavy engineering industries, mostly dedicated to railways and turbines. Belfort is the hometown of Alstom where the first TGVs (Trains à Grande Vitesse, High Speed Trains) were produced, as well as hosting the GE Power European headquarters and a centre of excellence for the manufacturing of gas turbines.

== Transport ==
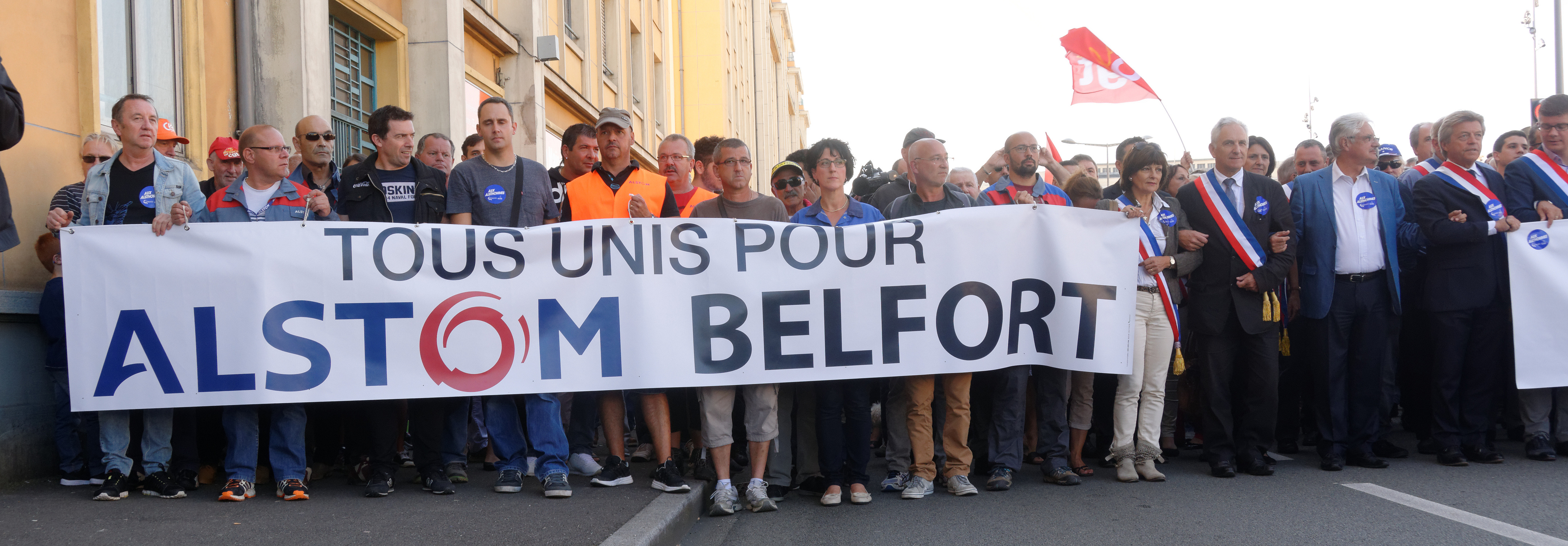
"All united for Belfort." Demonstration for Alstom against the loss of 6,500 jobs.

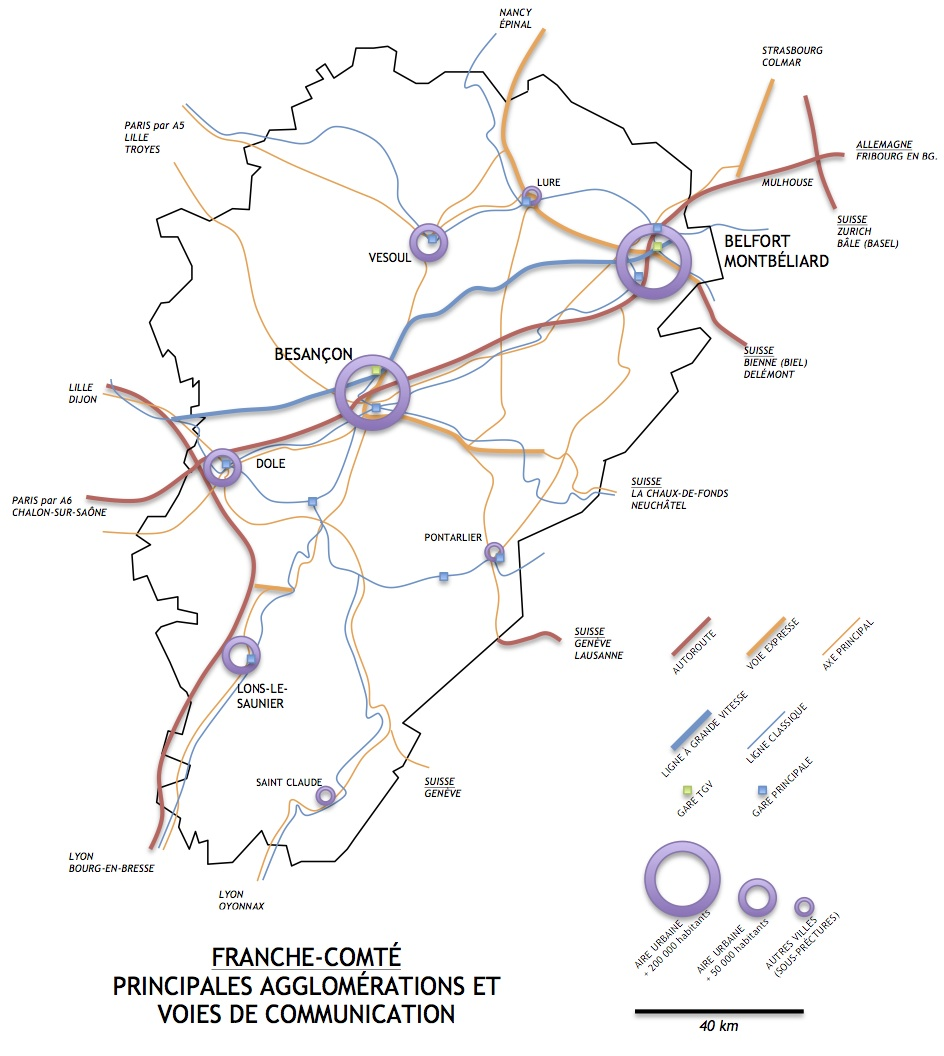
Belfort in the road and train network of Franche-Comté

=== Road ===
Belfort is located at a busy hub in the region's local and long-distance road network. Its proximity to the commercial port of Mulhouse-Rhin facilitates international trade. The motorway A36 from Beaune to Mulhouse follows a route to the south and east of the city, and forms the main axis linking Belfort to other French and European cities. Passing just south of town, N19 connects Langres (and thereby Paris and Troyes) to the Swiss canton of Jura.

=== Air ===
EuroAirport Basel-Mulhouse-Freiburg is located about 60 km (37 mi) east of Belfort (1 hour drive).

=== Rail links ===
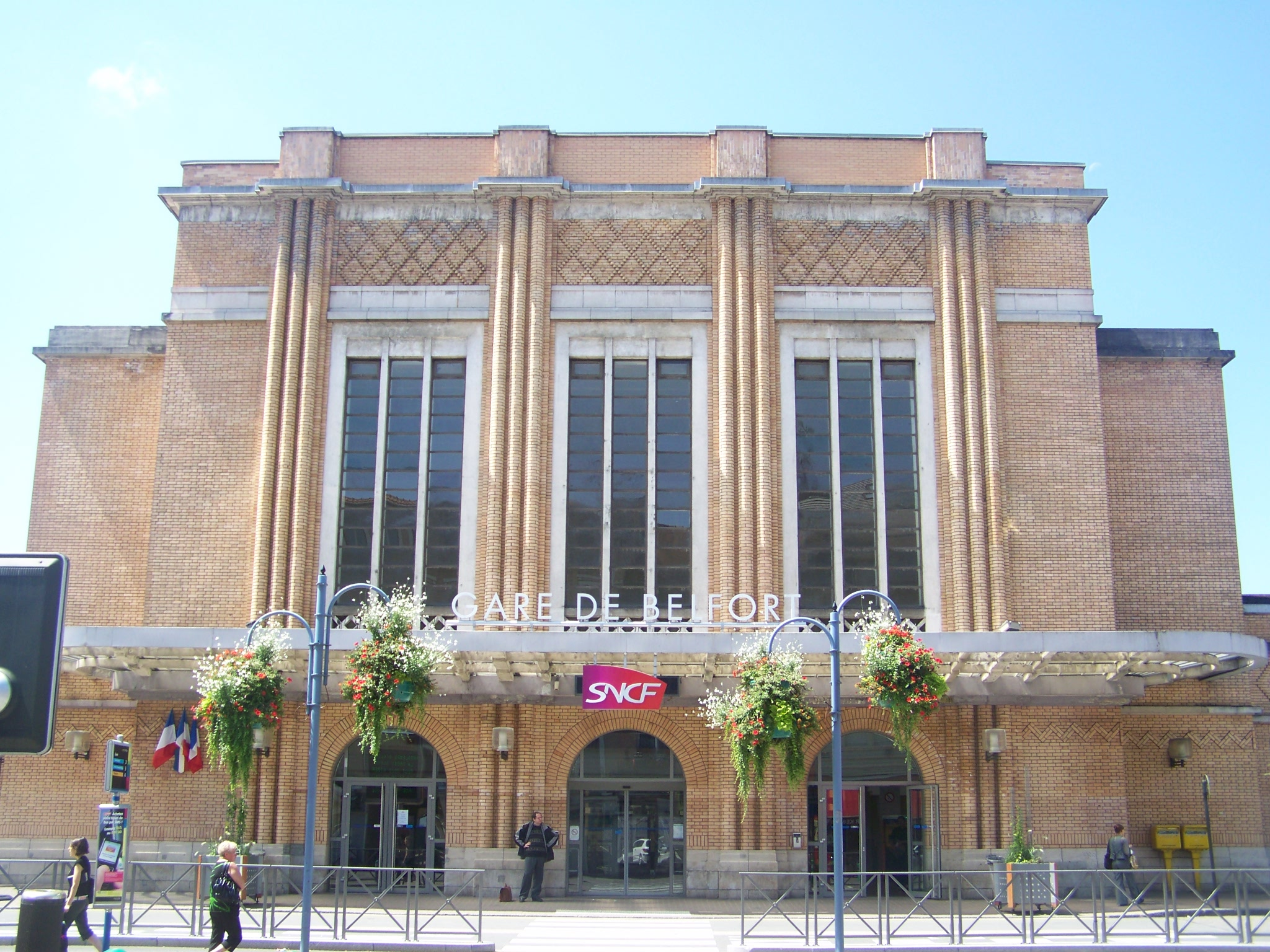
SNCF station of Belfort-Ville

Belfort is well connected with the rest of France, with direct connections by train to major destinations such as Paris, Dijon, Besançon, Mulhouse, Strasbourg, Lyon, Marseille, Montpellier and Lille, including high-speed trains. Some trains operate into Switzerland, such as Basel and Zürich stations. There is also a train service to Frankfurt am Main in Germany.

Regional services connect Belfort to Montbéliard, Besançon, Mulhouse, Vesoul, Épinal and Nancy.

- Belfort station is the main railway station in the centre of the city.
- Belfort – Montbéliard TGV station is the high speed railway station, located 9 km (6 mi) south of the city.

From 2017, regional trains will connect Belfort with Belfort-Montbéliard TGV station using the new Belfort–Delle railway link. This service links Belfort and the surrounding area to Switzerland, and the high-speed train link will connect Swiss towns such as Delémont, Bern, Fribourg and Lausanne to Paris and other cities. Before 2020, the service Épinal-Belfort will be electrified and modernized. This will allow a link between LGV Est and LGV Rhin-Rhône in Belfort-Montbéliard TGV station, opening new destinations like Nancy, Metz and Luxembourg.

== Sights ==
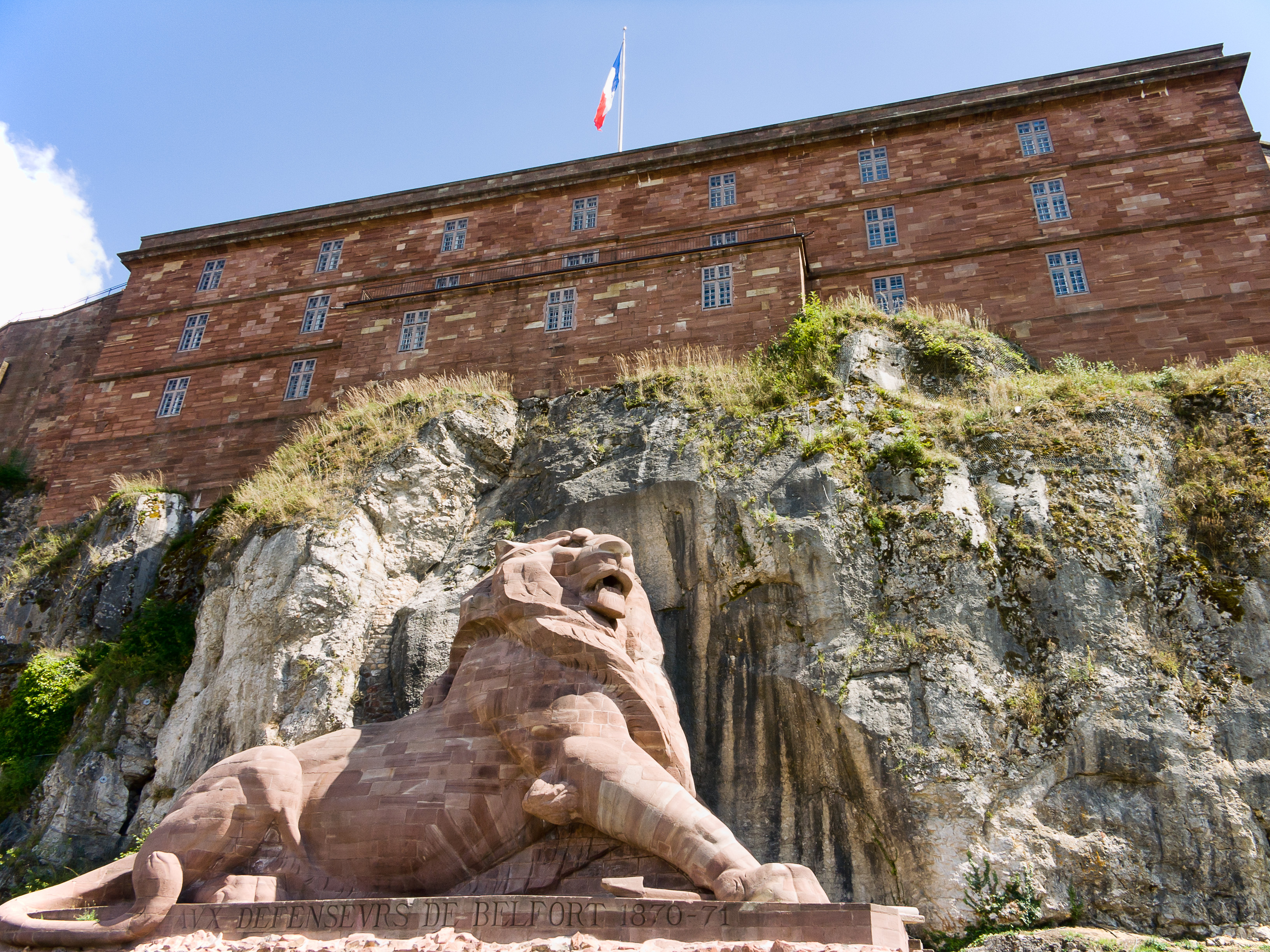
Lion of Belfort

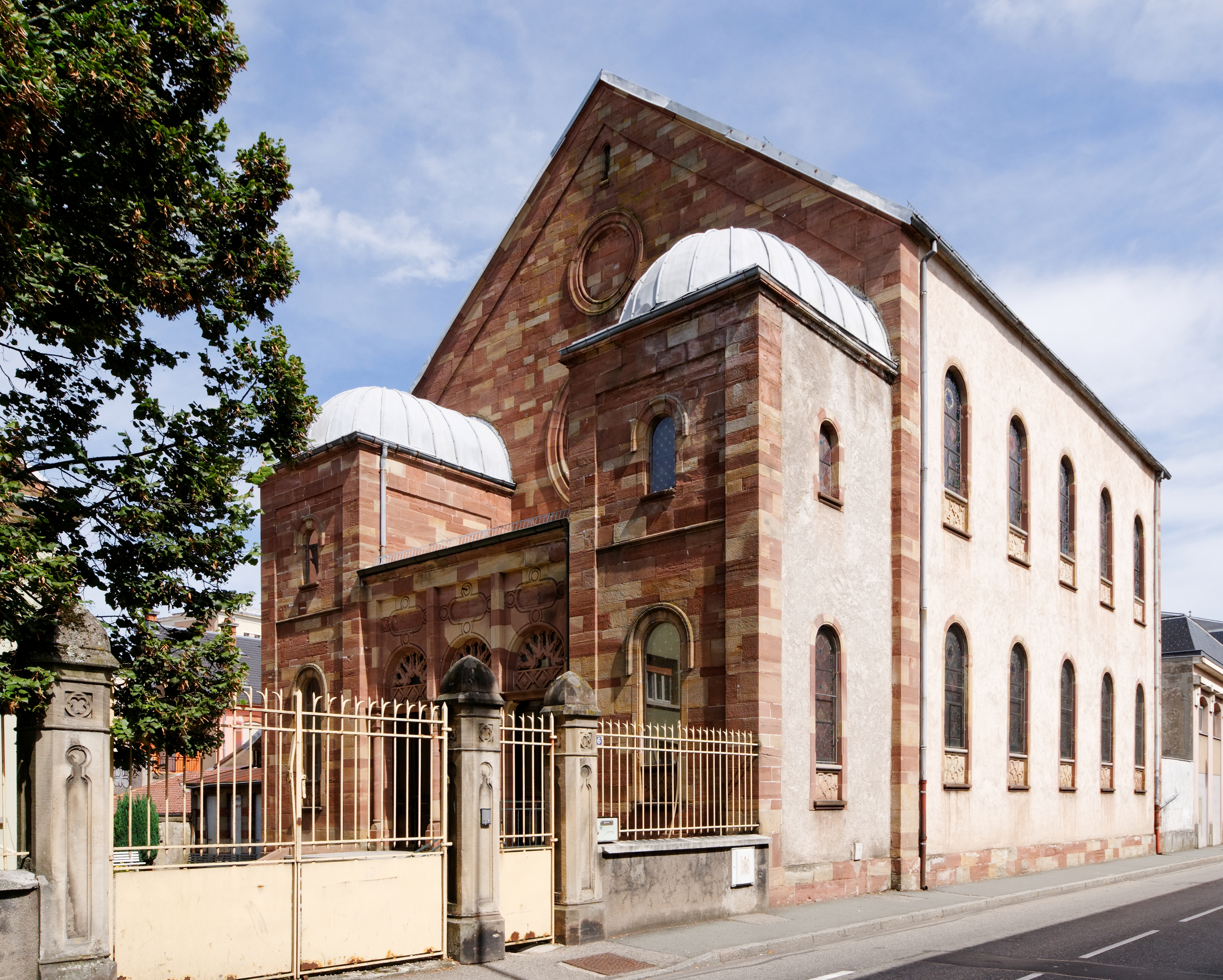
The Belfort Synagogue erected in 1857

- Belfort is the home of the Lion of Belfort, a sculpture (that expressed people's resistance against the siege in the Franco-Prussian War (1870)) by Frédéric Bartholdi – who shortly afterwards built the Statue of Liberty in New York.
- The Belfort Citadel – A unique example of Vauban pentagonal fortifications
- The Belfort Cathedral, 18th century
- The Belfort Synagogue erected in 1857
- The old town
- The Belfort city museums feature three main areas:
  - History (from archeology to military) in the old barracks on the top of the citadel.
  - Art (mainly from 16th to 19th century) in the Tour 41
  - Modern Art in the Donation Jardot
- Since July 2007, the site of "La Citadelle de la Liberté", the citadel of Liberty has been open to the public – with a son et lumière animated trail in the moats and its big underground passage.
- From the top of a tall building or going up the nearby mountains on a clear day, the ice-capped mountains of the Alps in Switzerland can be seen.
- Grand souterrain de la citadelle de Belfort- the underground passage of Belfort Citadel.

== Culture ==
=== Eurockéennes ===
Belfort's best known cultural event is the annual Eurockéennes, one of France's largest rock music festivals.

=== FIMU ===
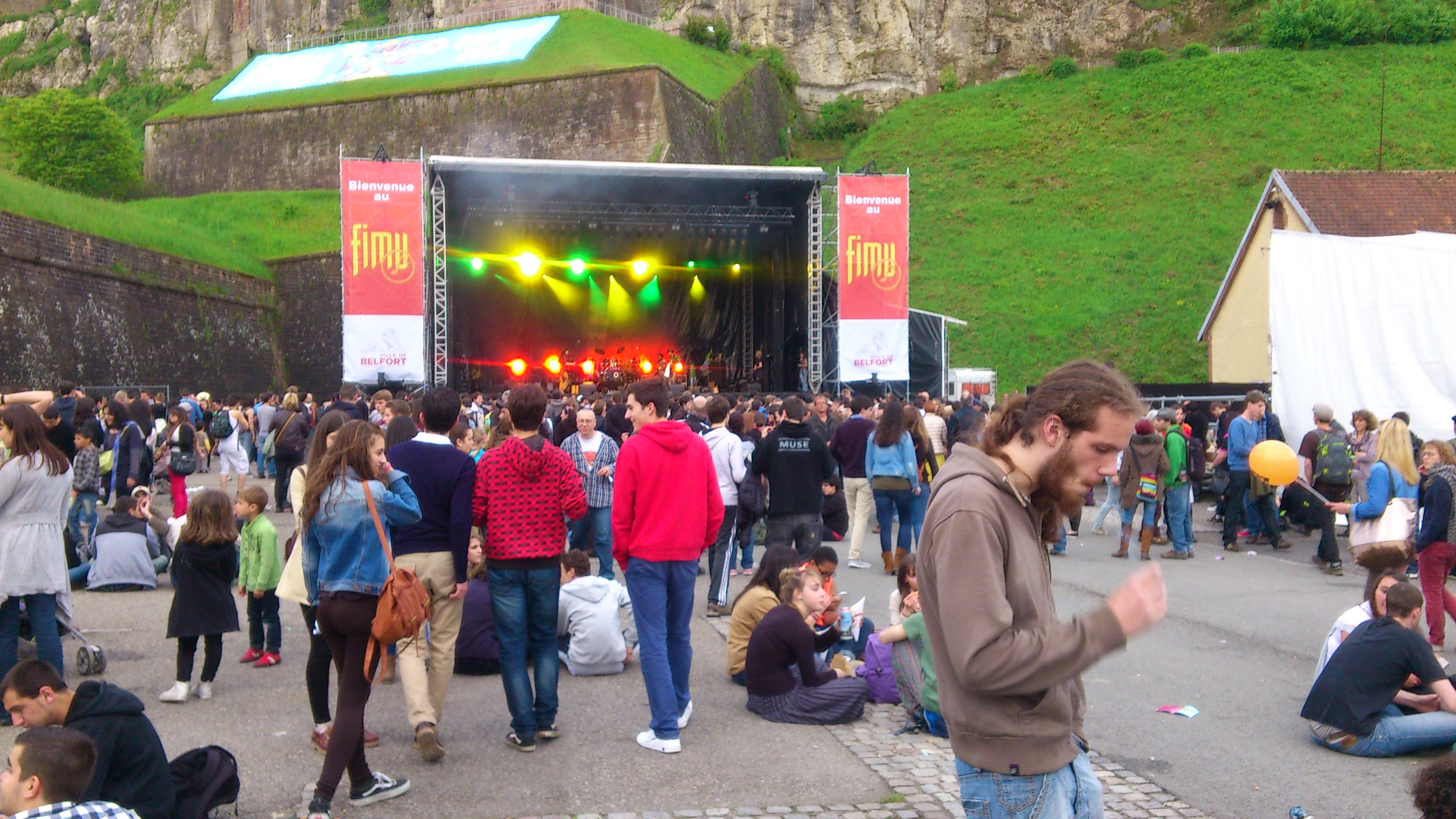
FIMU in 2013.

Belfort is also well known for hosting the annual Festival International de Musique Universitaire (FIMU) held in May each year. FIMU usually involves over 250 concerts at different locations around the city and around 2500 musicians, most of them students or amateur groups from countries across Europe and the rest of the world. Music styles performed are extremely diverse and include traditional, folk, rock, jazz, classical and experimental.

== Notable people ==
=== Births ===
Belfort was the birthplace of:

- Joseph de La Porte (1714–1779), 18th-century Jesuit, literary critic, poet and playwright.
- Marie-Anne Françoise Brideau (1751–1794), Carmelite nun (Sœur Saint Louis), one of the sixteen Martyrs of Compiègne
- François Sébastien Christophe Laporte (1760–1823), French Revolutionary politician
- François Joseph Heim (1787–1865), painter
- Marie-Anne Leroudier (1838-1908), embroiderer
- Jules Brunet (1838–1911), a member of the first French Military Mission to Japan in order to help modernize the armies of the shogunate
- Alexander Toponce (1839–1923), American pioneer
- Louis-Gabriel-Charles Vicaire (1848–1900), poet
- Paul Faivre (1886–1973), actor
- Pierre Macherey (1938– ), literary critic
- Jean-Pierre Chevènement (1939– ), politician
- Raymond Forni (1941–2008), politician
- Gérard Grisey (born 1946–1998), composer
- Tahar Rahim (1981– ), actor
- Thomas Holbein (1983– ), professional footballer
- Frederic Duplus, footballer
- John Glele, footballer
- Catherine Joly, classical pianist
- Fabrice Balanche, geographer
- Bruno Famin, automotive engineer, F1

== International relations ==
Belfort is twinned with:

- Delémont, Switzerland
- Leonberg, Germany
- Zaporizhzhia, Ukraine
- Stafford, England, United Kingdom
- Tanghin-Dassouri, Burkina Faso

== See also ==
- Communes of the Territoire de Belfort department
- Fortified region of Belfort
- Roman Catholic Diocese of Belfort-Montbéliard
- The works of Antonin Mercié
