= Belfort Synagogue =

Jewish synagogue in Belfot, France

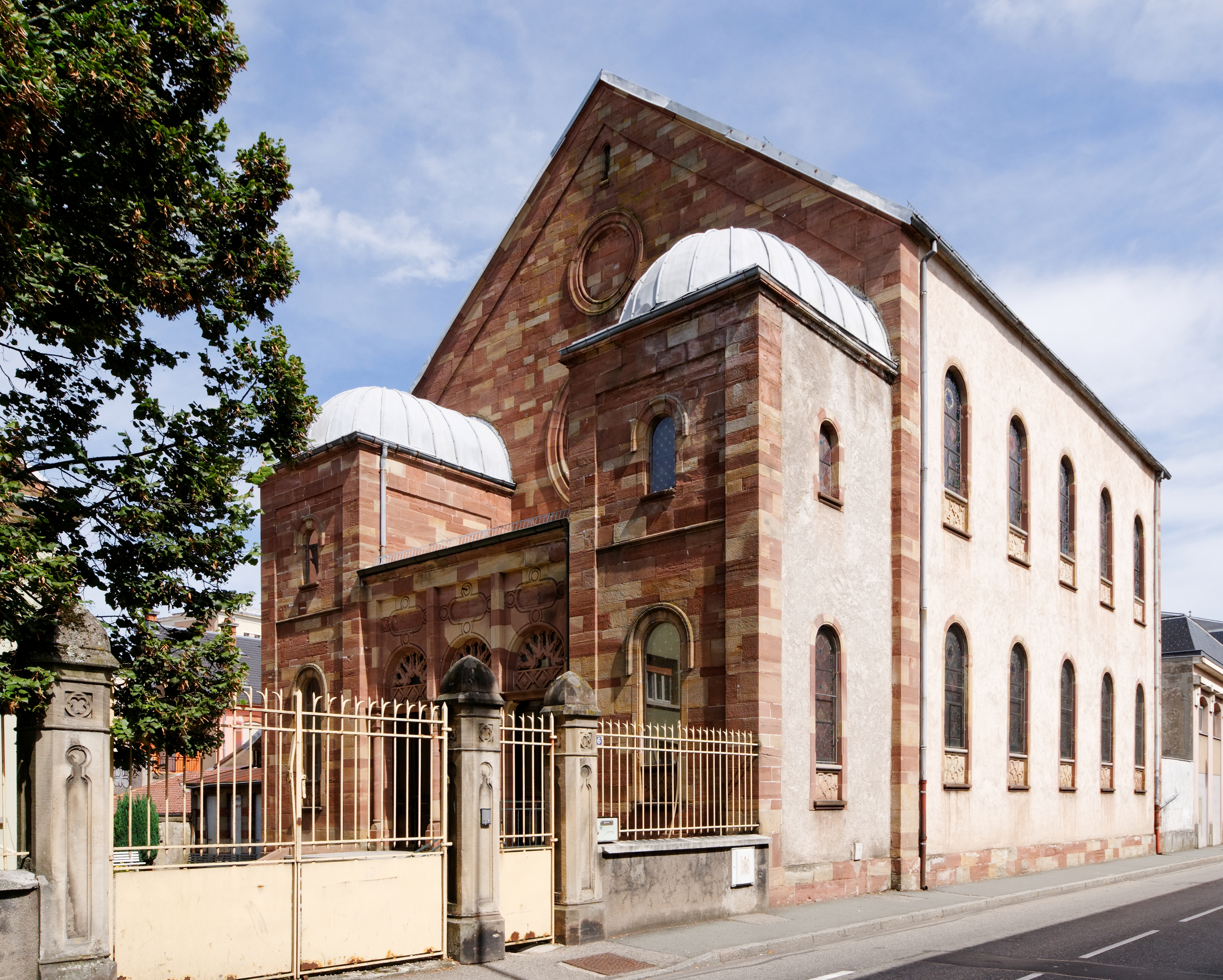
- The synagogue in 2011

- Location of the synagogue in France

Religion
- Affiliation: Judaism
- Rite: Nusach Ashkenaz
- Ecclesiastical or organizational status: Synagogue
- Status: Active

Location
- Location: 6, rue de l'As-de-Carreau, Bourgogne-Franche-Comté, Belfort
- Country: France
- Interactive map of Belfort Synagogue
- Coordinates: 47°38′17″N 6°51′24″E

Architecture
- Architects: Léon Jossier; Aristide Poisat
- Type: Synagogue architecture
- Style: Byzantine Revival
- Completed: 1857

Specifications
- Dome: Two
- Materials: Stone

Monument historique
- Official name: Synagogue
- Type: Base Mérimée
- Designated: October 1993
- Reference no.: PA00101143

The Belfort Synagogue is a Jewish congregation and synagogue, located at 6, rue de l'As-de-Carreau, in the city center of Belfort, in the Bourgogne-Franche-Comté region of France. The congregation worships in the Ashkenazi rite.

The Jewish community was established in the town in the 13th century. Today the congregation is active, although the Jewish community is very small.

The stone synagogue building was erected in 1857, designed by Léon Jossier and Aristide Poisat in the Byzantine Revival style during the Second French Empire. The building was added as a monument historique on 18 October 1983. In 2015, the synagogue was one of several synagogues subjected to antisemitic attacks.

An old Jewish cemetery from 1811 is in current use. In the nearby town of Foussemagne, Jews from Belfort and Foussemagne renovated the Foussemagne former synagogue building as a Jewish museum.

== Gallery ==
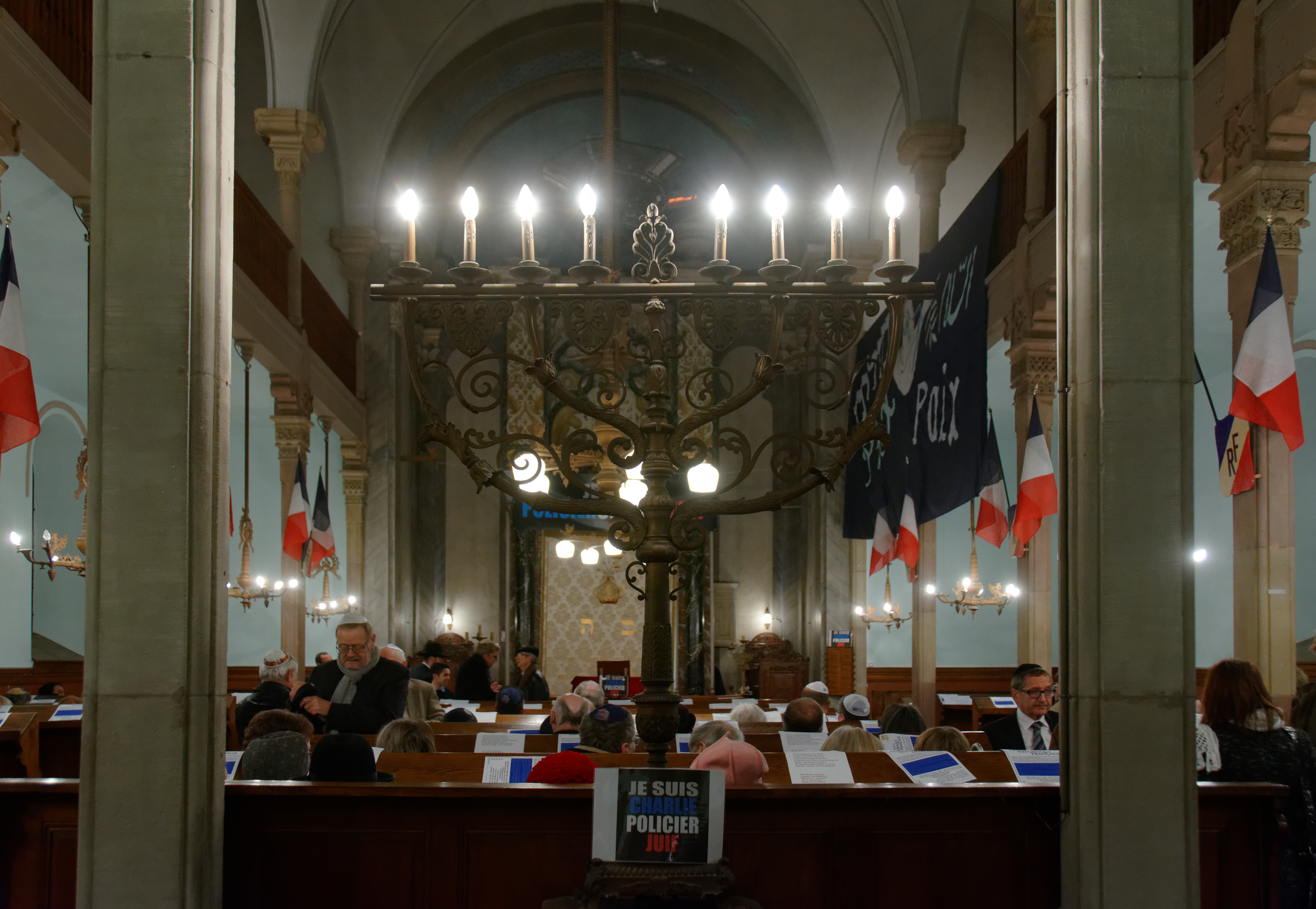
Ceremony after the January 2015 attacks in France

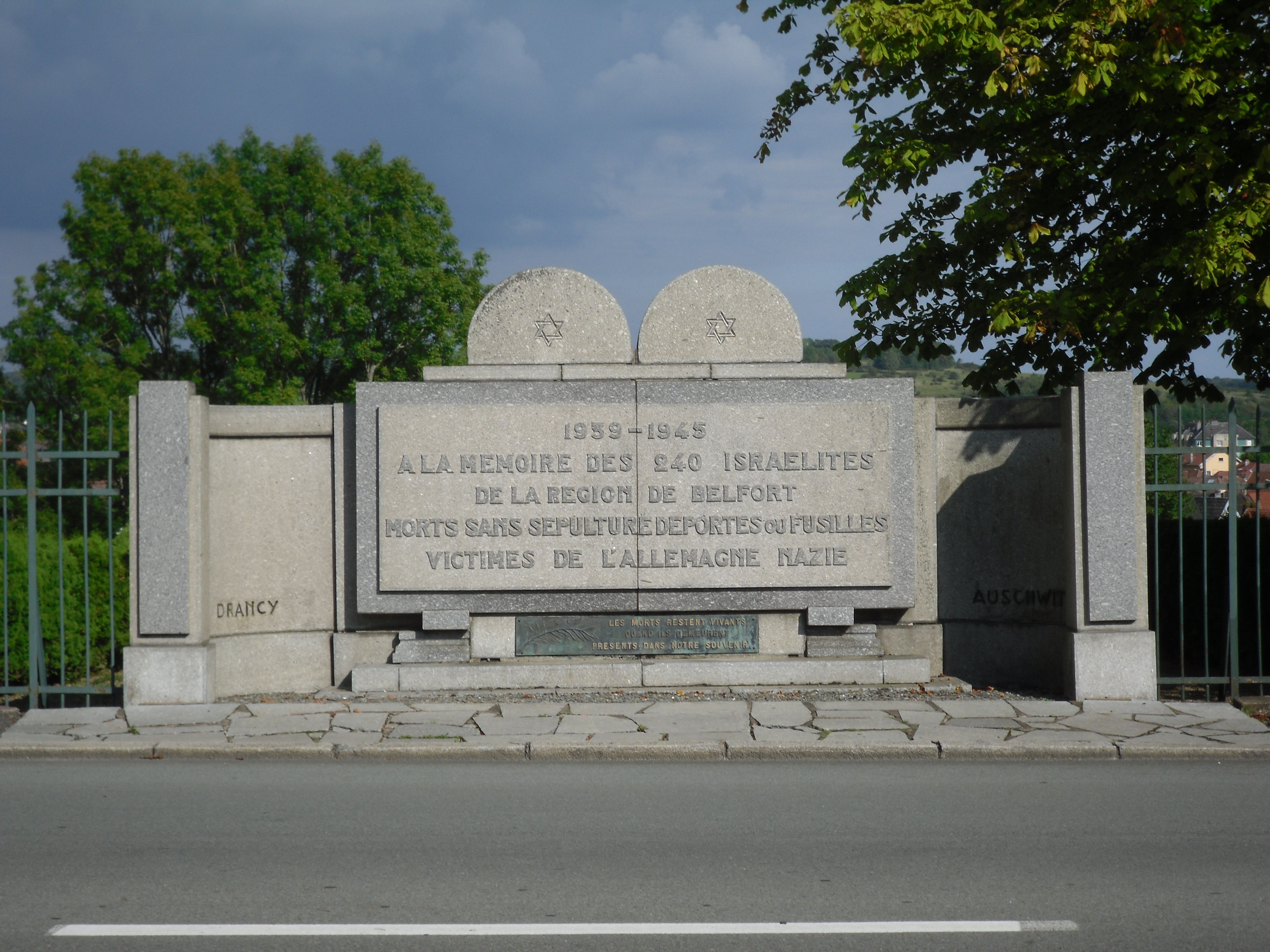
Monument at the Jewish cemetery of Belfort

== See also ==
- History of the Jews in France
- List of synagogues in France
