= Therese Holbein von Holbeinsberg =

Austrian painter and etcher (c.1785–1857)

Therese Holbein von Holbeinsberg (c. 1785 – 1859) was an Austrian landscape painter and etcher. She is considered a member of the family of painters connected to Hans Holbein the Elder.

== Biography ==
Therese Holbein was born n c. 1785 in Graz. She was likely a descendant of the important family of painters around Hans Holbein the Elder. Her grandfather Johann Georg Holbein, an Imperial Court Councillor's Clerk, was awarded the title of Holbeinsberg in 1756. After the death of her father, Lieutenant Colonel Philipp Holbein von Holbeinsberg, Therese Holbein remained the only survivor of his six children, which meant that the male line of the family had died out. Therefore, at her request, and with imperial approval, the "von Holbein" title was transferred in 1852 to the male theater director Franz Ignaz von Holbein, whose grandfather Joseph von Holbein was the brother of Johann Georg Holbein.

Therese Holbein lived in her hometown of Graz and from around 1814 until her death, she lived in Vienna. She remained unmarried, lived a secluded life and devoted herself to her art until old age. Only a few of her works were made public during her lifetime. These included a series of 30 landscape etchings, which were mainly created in 1812–1813. In 1855, she presented two etchings entitled Waldpartie at the 64th exhibition of the Austrian Art Association. She died in Vienna in 1859.

=== Media ===
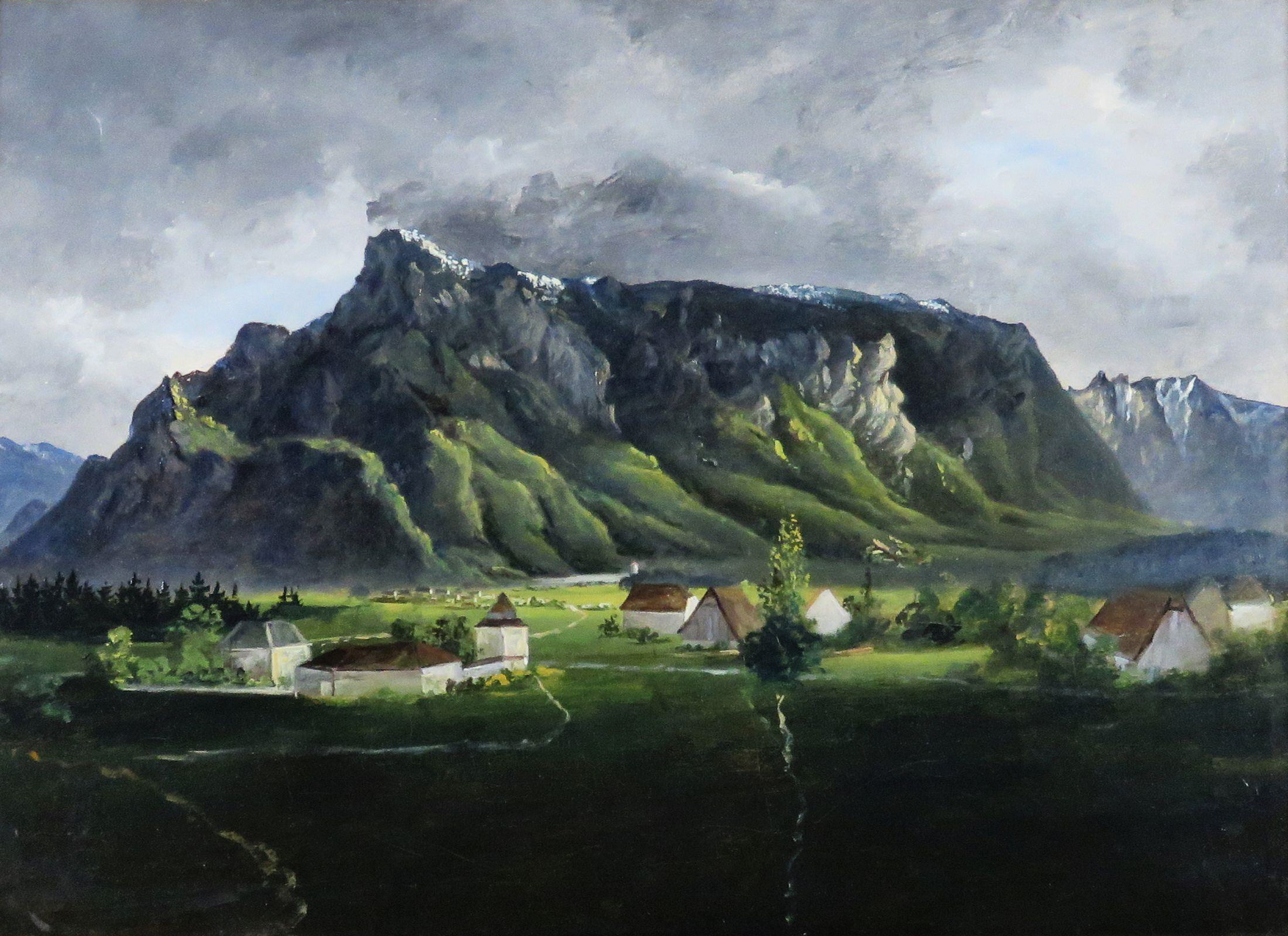
Oil painting View of the Untersberg (1827)

Therese Holbein created oil paintings, watercolors and gouache, and etched and drew with pencil and black chalk. She created mainly romantic, atmospheric landscapes, often focusing on the transience of nature and human activity, for example by depicting fallen trees and ruins. She sometimes painted from nature with motifs from Vienna, Styria and the Alps, and sometimes used drawings by other artists such as Rembrandt, Allaert van Everdingen and Martin von Molitor as models. She signed her works either with the initials "TH", with her full name or an abbreviated version of her name.

=== Exhibitions ===
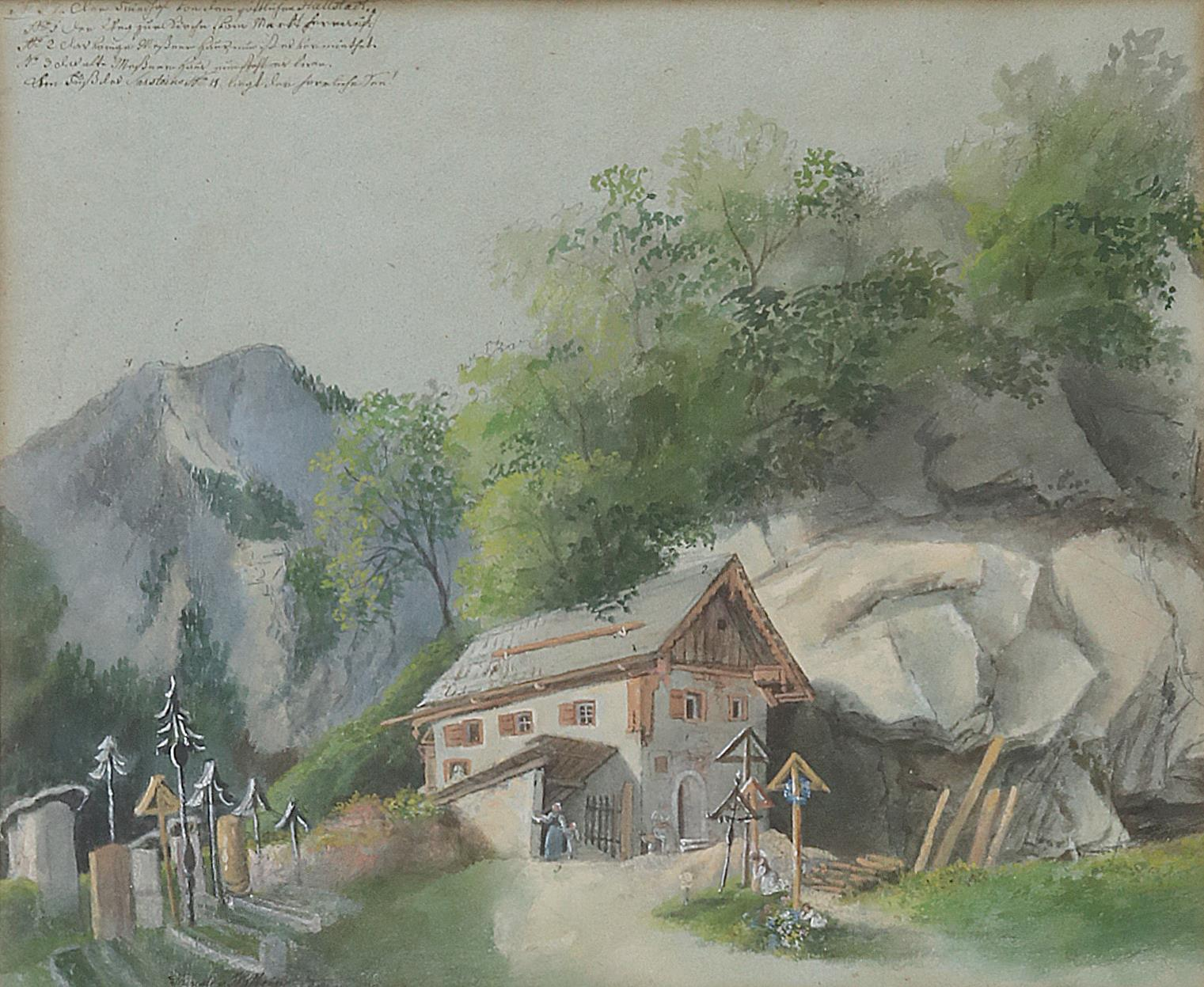
Motif near the Dachstein

Works by Therese Holbein can be found in the collections of the Kupferstichkabinett Berlin, the Austrian Gallery Belvedere, the Vienna Museum, the Kupferstichkabinett of the Academy of Fine Arts Vienna, the Albertina, the Philadelphia Museum of Art and the Harvard Art Museums, among others.

Two works by Therese Holbein from 1814 were presented in 1987–1988 at the exhibition The Hidden Museum at the Academy of Arts in Berlin, organized by Gisela Breitling and Evelyn Kuwertz. Her oil painting Prater Landscape, created in 1826, was part of the 1999 exhibition Change of View and Insight – Female Artists in Austria. From the Collection of the Historical Museum of the City of Vienna.

== Selected works ==
- Broken Willow with Lying Dog
- Ruins Rauenstein and Rauheneck near Baden
- Light forest landscape with meadows and idyllic rural figures, gouache on blue paper, 38.7 × 55.6 cm, Albertina, Vienna
- Limberg and Stirie. Suite de VI vues des environs de ce château, etching, 1813, Samuel Putnam Avery Collection, New York Public Library
- Fallen Willow, etching, 1814
- Broken Old Tree, oil, 1820
- Waterfall in the Mountains watercolor and gouache, 1821
- Prater landscape, oil on canvas, 1826, 34.5 × 47.5 cm, Vienna Museum
- View of the Untersberg, signed and dated lower left “1827 à Salzburg, Th. de Holbein”, oil on canvas, 32.5 × 46 cm
- Hermannskogel watercolor, 1832
