= Thomas Holbein =

French footballer (born 1983)

Personal information
- Date of birth: March 6, 1983 (age 43)
- Place of birth: Belfort, France
- Height: 1.79 m (5 ft 10 1/2 in)
- Position: Defender

Team information
- Current team: Illzach Modenheim

Youth career
- Sochaux

Senior career*
Years	Team	Apps	(Gls)
2000–2003	Sochaux B	40	(1)
2003–2005	Besançon RC	58	(5)
2005–2006	Legnano	0	(0)
2006–2010	FC Mulhouse	57	(0)
2010–2012	SR Colmar	38	(1)
2012–	Illzach Modenheim		
- * Club domestic league appearances and goals

Thomas Holbein (born March 6, 1983) is a French professional footballer, who currently plays in the Championnat de France amateur 2 for AS Illzach Modenheim.

== Career ==
Holbein played at the professional level in Ligue 2 for Besançon RC and in Serie C2 for A.C. Legnano.
