= Mont Saint-Quentin in Moselle Valley =

Summit near Metz in Grand Est, France

Mont Saint-Quentin (Saint-Quentin Mountain)
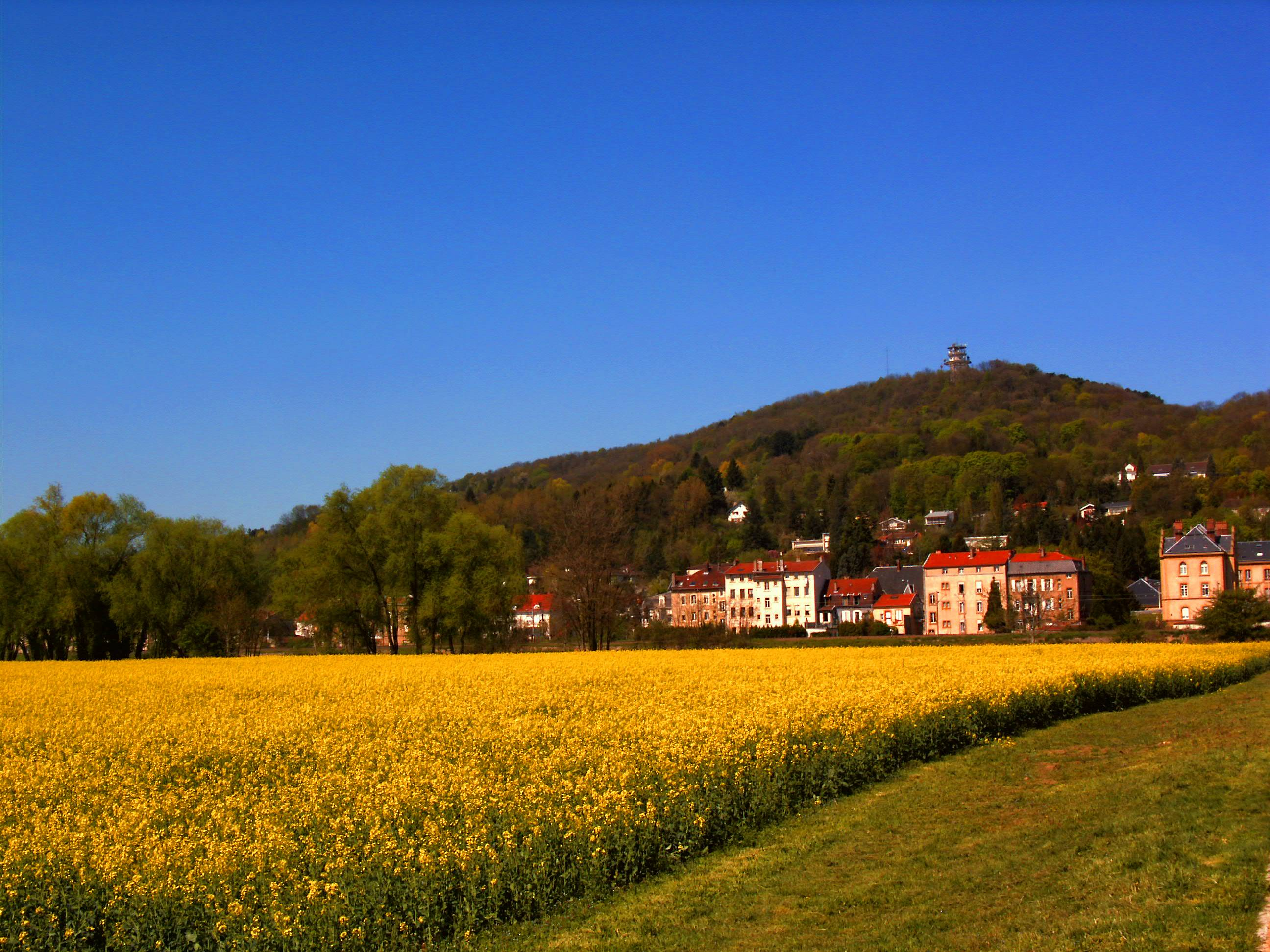
- The town of Ban-Saint-Martin and Mount Saint-Quentin.

Highest point
- Elevation: 360 m (1,180 ft)
- Coordinates: 49°07′18″N 6°07′20″E

Dimensions
- Length: 6/07/20/E

Geography
- Location: France
- Parent range: Côtes de Moselle

Mount Saint-Quentin (Saint-Quentin Mountain) is a summit that lays in Moselle Valley to the west of the Metz area. Due to its location, it played a strategic role in observation, protection, and communication for the city of Metz located below.

== Geography ==
=== Situation ===
Mount Saint-Quentin is one of the summits of the Côtes de Moselle. It extends over the communes of Scy-Chazelles, Le Ban-Saint-Martin, Longeville-lès-Metz, Plappeville and Lessy. It has a height of 360 meters.

=== Access ===
The site is accessible by various roads leading to the Col de Lessy. Several tens of kilometers of trails are available to hikers to avoid wild routes, thus preserving the flora and fauna.

=== Fauna and flora ===
The fauna and flora are very diverse, with around 900 species of butterflies, as well as orchids, bats, etc., which are adapted to withstand extreme conditions of heat and drought. Many species and habitats are protected at European and local level.

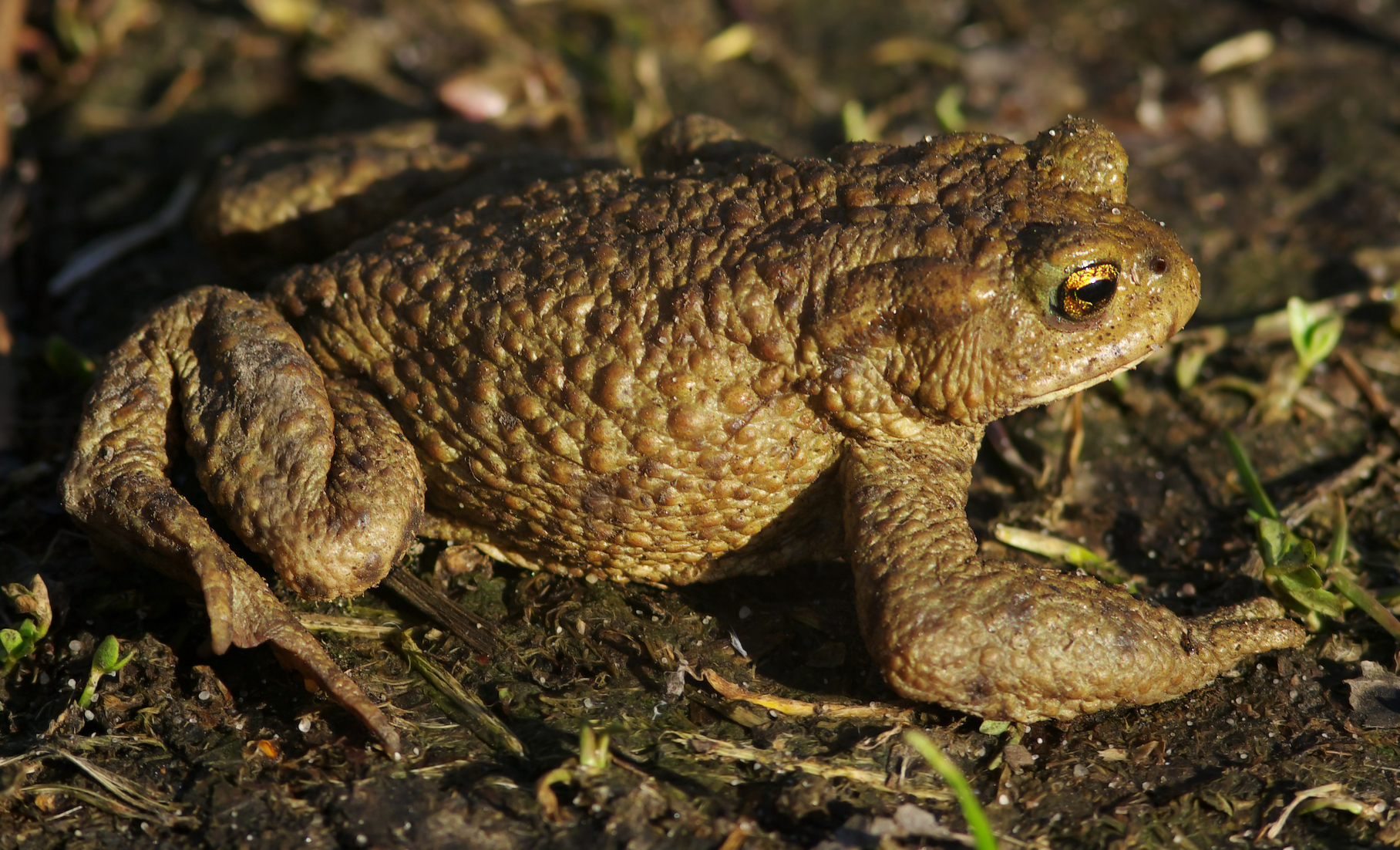
Common toad

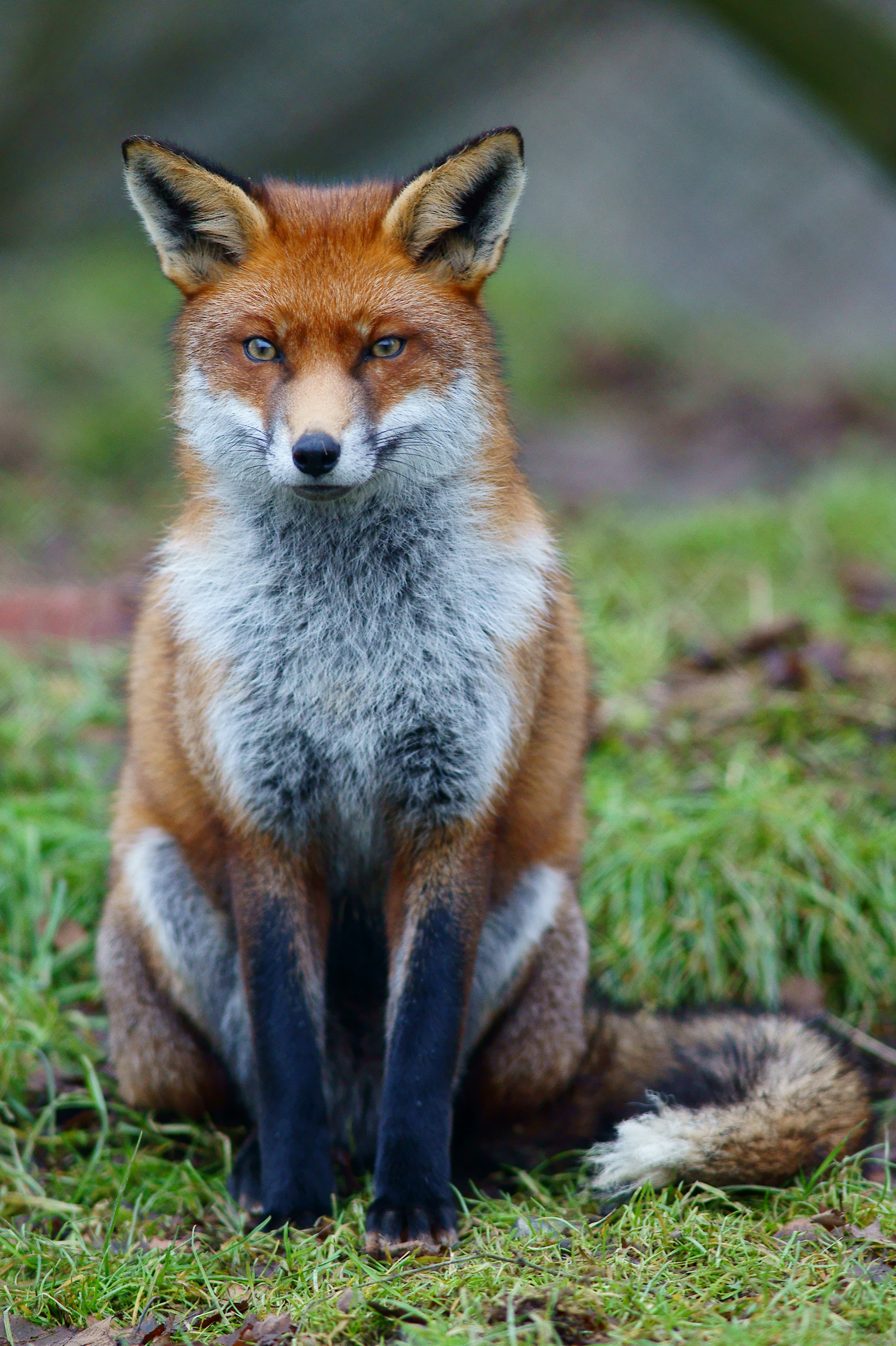
Fox

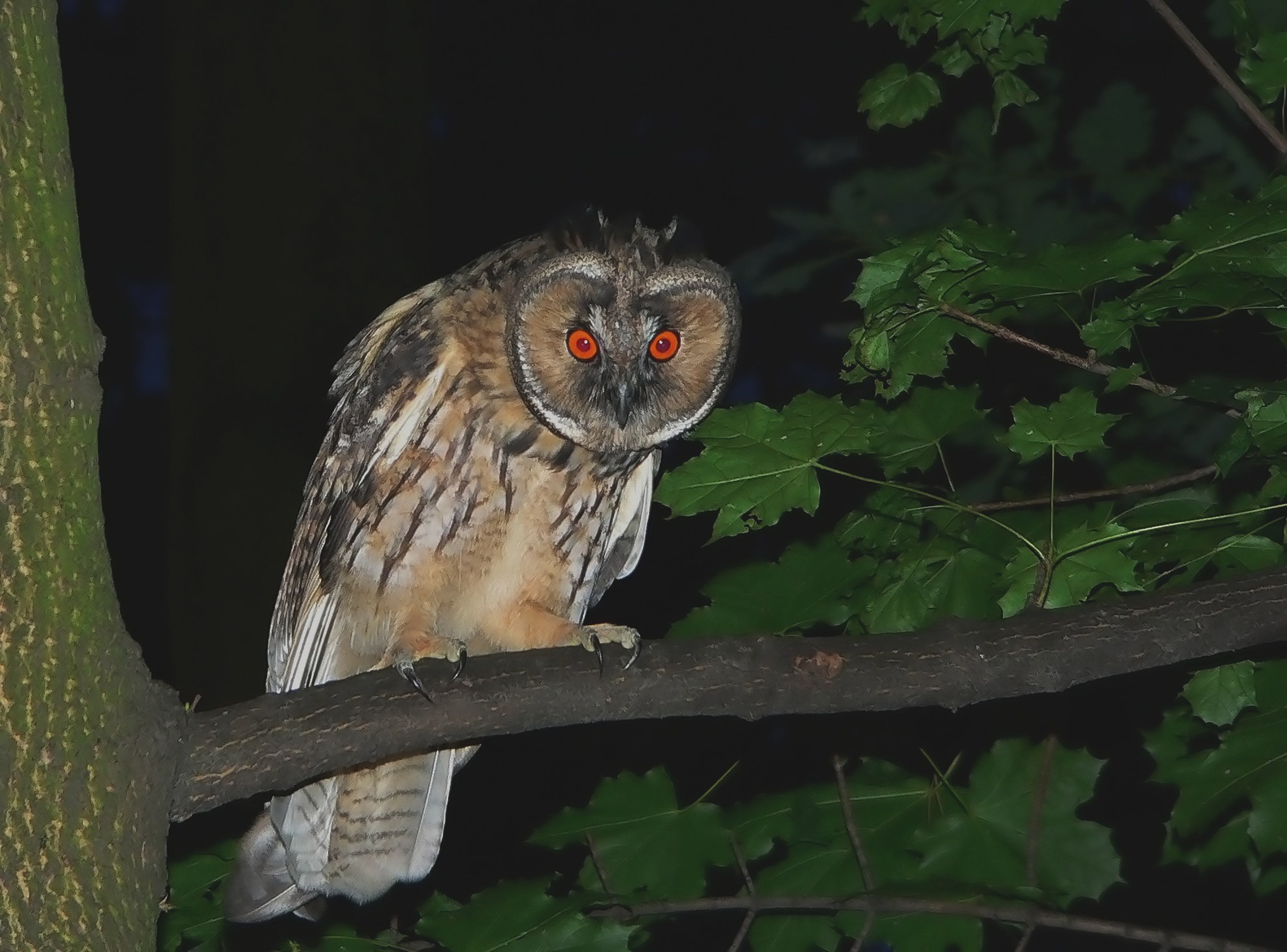
Long-eared owl

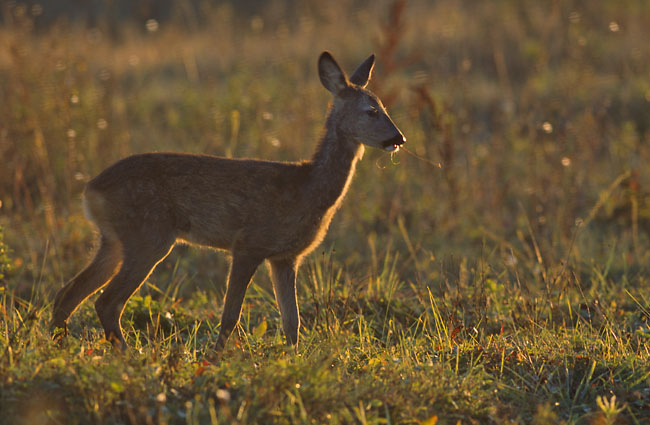
Deer

=== Geology ===
The mountain has the same geological formation as the Moselle coast of which it is a part, i.e. a filtering calcareous subsoil and the south/southwest exposure of this coast, with nutrient-poor calcareous and calcareous grassland.

== History ==
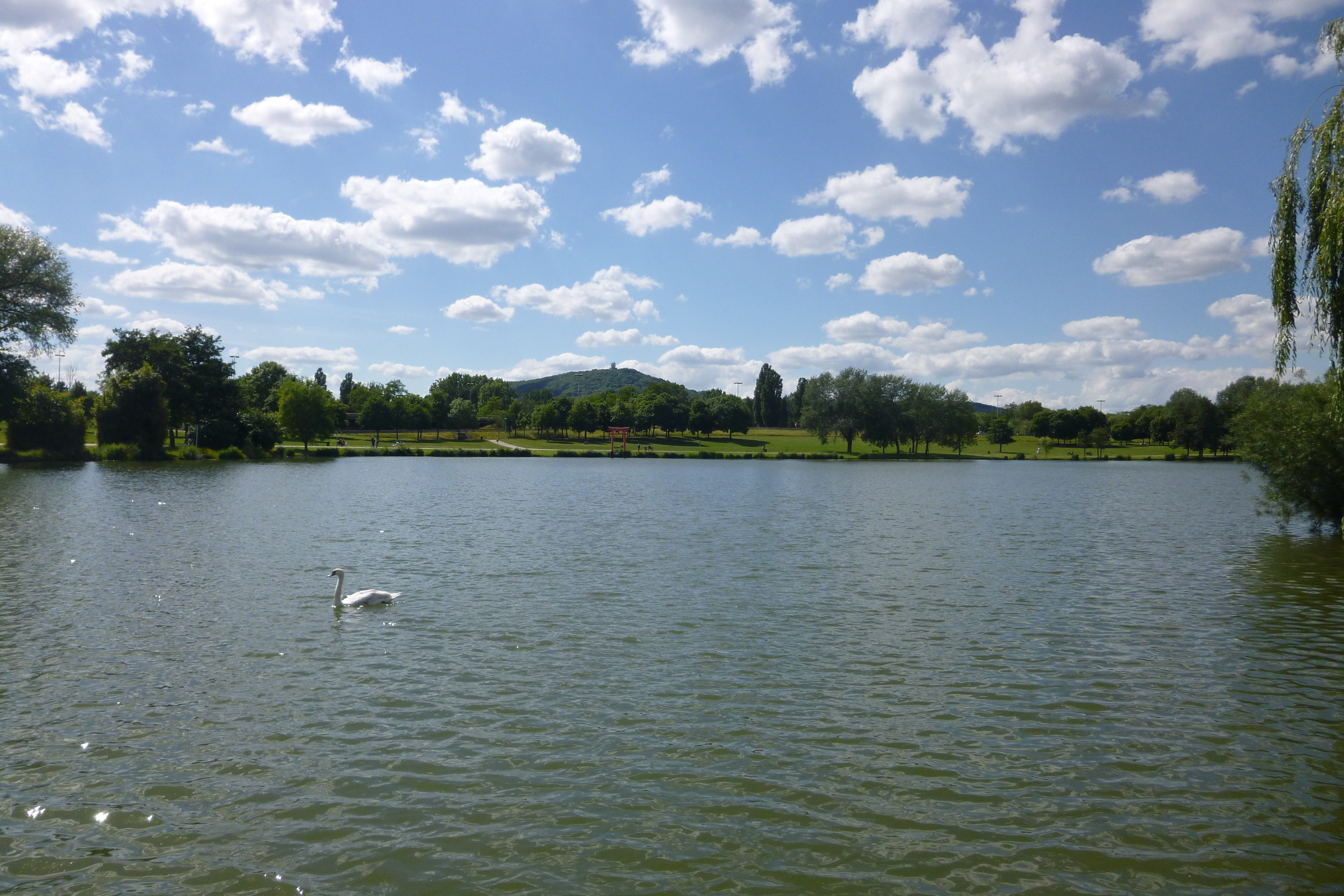
View of Mount Saint-Quentin in the background, from the water's edge.

In 835, Drogon, the 40th bishop of Metz, brought back relics of Saint Quentin from Saint-Quentin en Vermandois. He had an oratory built at the top of the mountain where the relics were deposited. This oratory was replaced by a sanctuary which served as a parish for several centuries for the inhabitants of Plappeville, Scy Chazelles, Lessy, and Longeville. In 1143, the church and its outbuildings came under the authority of the abbey of Gorze, and then in 1212, it was returned to the abbey of Saint-Symphorien.

In the 13th century, it became part of the domain of the chapter of the Cathedral of Metz. On the mountain, there was the four-pillar sign of the high justice of the cathedral chapter, on the Saint-Paul banns of the villages of this parish, and the neighboring villages. The parish was then transferred to Scy. In the 13th century, the church was destroyed and replaced by a chapel and a hermitage, both of which also disappeared during the French Revolution. A Chappe optical telegraph station was installed on the mountain in 1797. Destroyed by the coalition troops in 1814 and then rebuilt, it ceased to function with the end of the Chappe line in 1852.

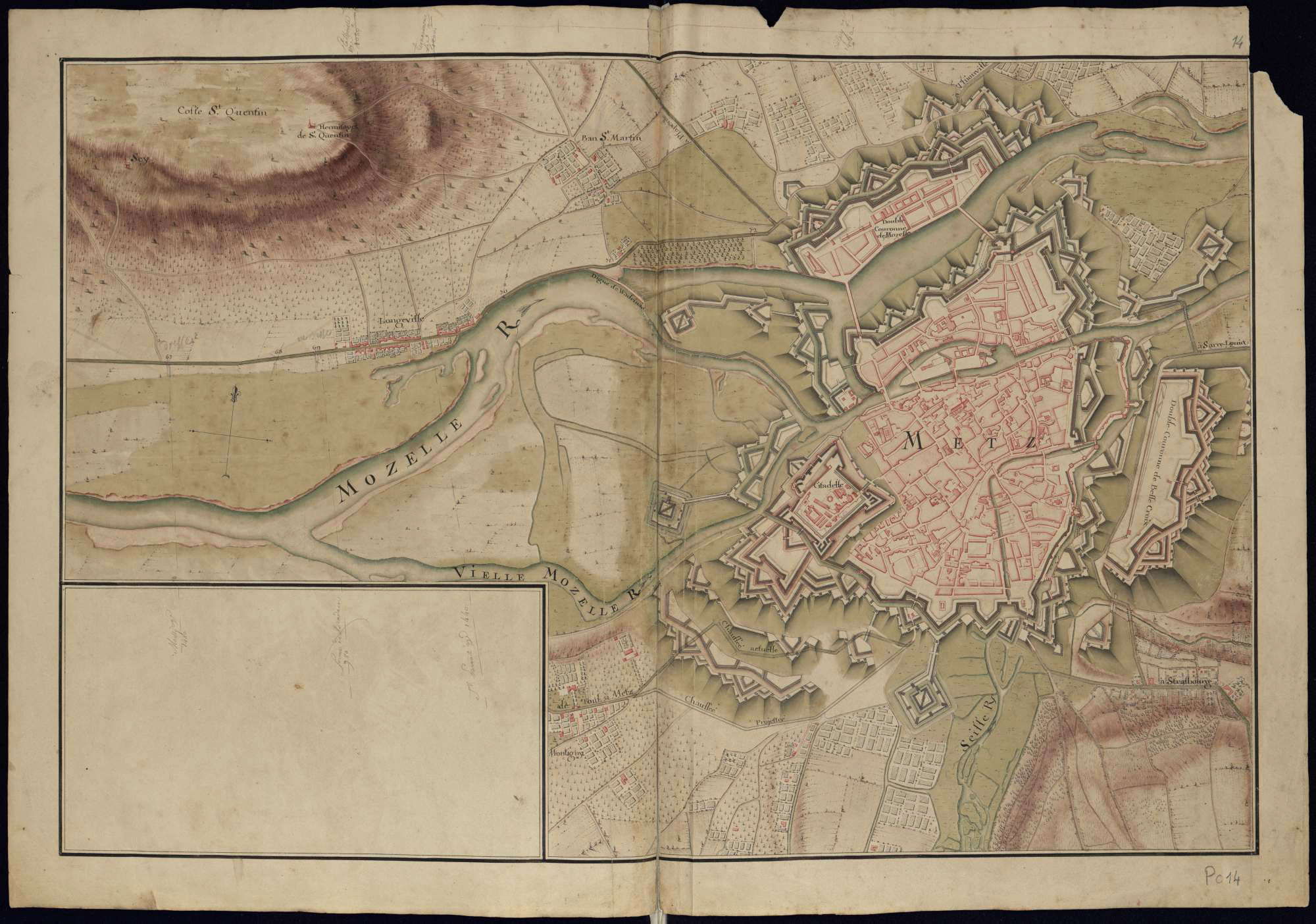
The mountain, called "côte", and the hermitage on the plate of Trudaine's atlas dedicated to Metz, 18th century (Archives Nationales).

=== 19th century ===
From 1867 to 1870, the army transformed Mount Saint-Quentin into an entrenched camp in order to distance the front line and reinforce the military fortifications of Metz. The Fortification of Saint-Quentin extends over 77 hectares. It is the largest fortified complex of the first Fortification belt of Metz. It consists of two main works, forts Diou and Girardin, linked by two connecting branches bordered by an artillery parapet. Fort Diou, which was renamed Ostfort by the Germans, was built east of Mount Saint-Quentin by the French from 1866 to 1870. It is trapezoidal in shape, has four bastions, 38 pieces, and can house a little over 600 men.

=== German annexation ===
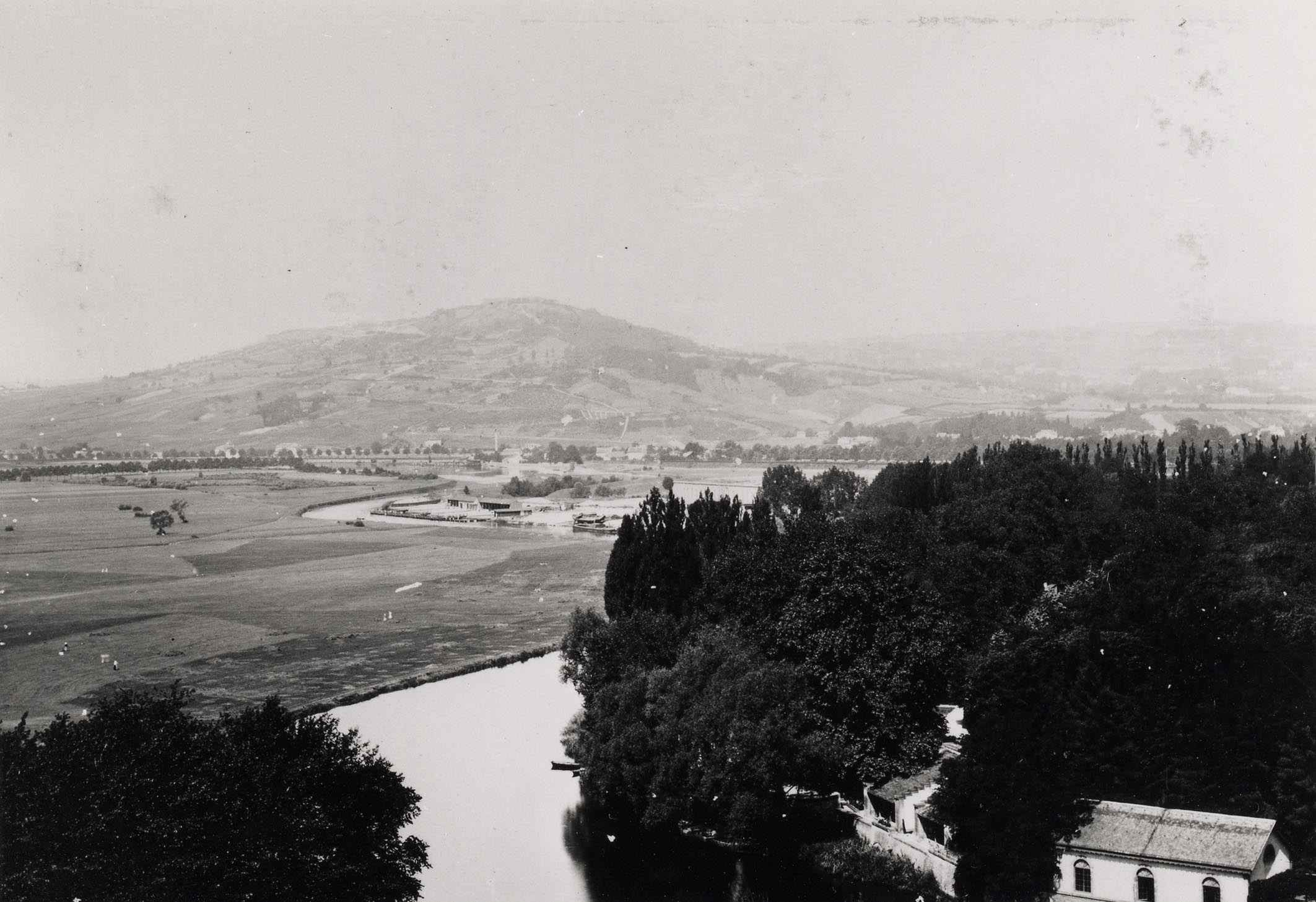
View of Mount Saint-Quentin from Metz in 1904 by Father Adam Pefferkorn.

The Germans completed the construction of the fort between 1872 and 1898, on the west side of Mount Saint-Quentin, by building a pentagonal fort that could accommodate 1,800 men. At first, it was named Fort Manstein, and then it was renamed Fort Girardin by the French. To the north is the Fort de Plappeville, covering 46 hectares. It worked as a defense for the western front and was linked to the fortified group of Saint-Quentin by the Lessy pass. The work was designed by Lieutenant-Colonel Séré de Rivières.

During the German annexation, the Bismarck Tower of Metz was also built here, the only example in France of one of the 240 homonymous towers built at that time throughout the Reich in memory of Otto von Bismarck. The Metzer Zeitung, a Metz newspaper founded in October 1871 by the Lang brothers, launched a subscription to build this memorial. It also proposed to rename the Mount Saint-Quentin to Bismarck Höhe, but this proposal was finally rejected. The tower is well preserved today, despite some recent acts of vandalism.

=== Second World War ===
During the Second World War, at the beginning of the Battle of Metz, a fire broke out on the nights of 31 August to 1 September 1994, in two of the three casemates of Fort Saint-Quentin where were stored the most precious documents of the Metz library collections: 588 manuscripts disappeared out of a total of 1,475 inventoried in the 1879 General Catalogue and its 1933 supplement, as well as 165 incunabula out of 614 volumes of incunabula (representing 781 bibliographic units). Fort Diou suffered heavily during the 1944 fighting.

=== Saint-Quentin today ===
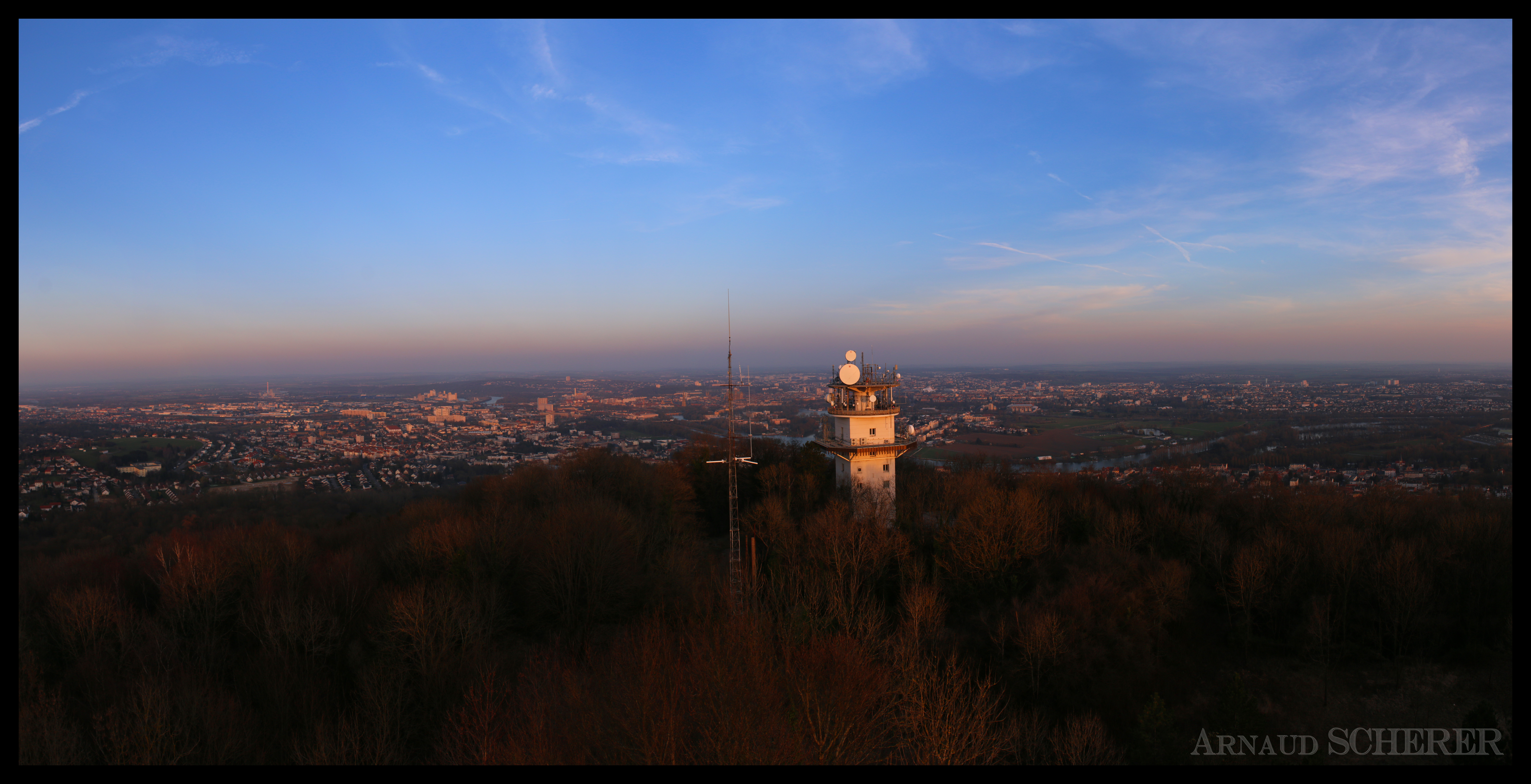
Panoramic view of Metz from the top of Mount Saint-Quentin.

On 29 June 1994, Mont Saint Quentin and its surroundings obtained the status of classified site on 1 375 hectares. Almost half of the place (675 ha) was classified as a Natura 2000 reserve. It is also one of the sites whose conservation or preservation is of interest in terms of its landscape, heritage, historical and ecological richness.

After a study phase carried out by the Établissement public foncier de Lorraine concerning the security of the site and the former military buildings, the Eurométropole urban community of Metz decided on 12 December 2005 to develop and secure the site to make it a place for walking and for the enhancement of the military architectural heritage and environmental protection.

The urban redevelopment company Cardem Demolitions (a subsidiary of Eurovia) and the demining company Géomines were selected by the army to secure the fortified group of Mont Saint-Quentin and the Fort of Plappeville.

== Also see ==
- Moselle Valley
- Metz
- Metz Cathedral
- Fortifications of Saint-Quentin
- Fortifications of Metz
