= Bismarck Tower (Metz) =

Sole surviving Bismarck Tower in France

Coordinates: 49°07′18″N 6°08′08″E

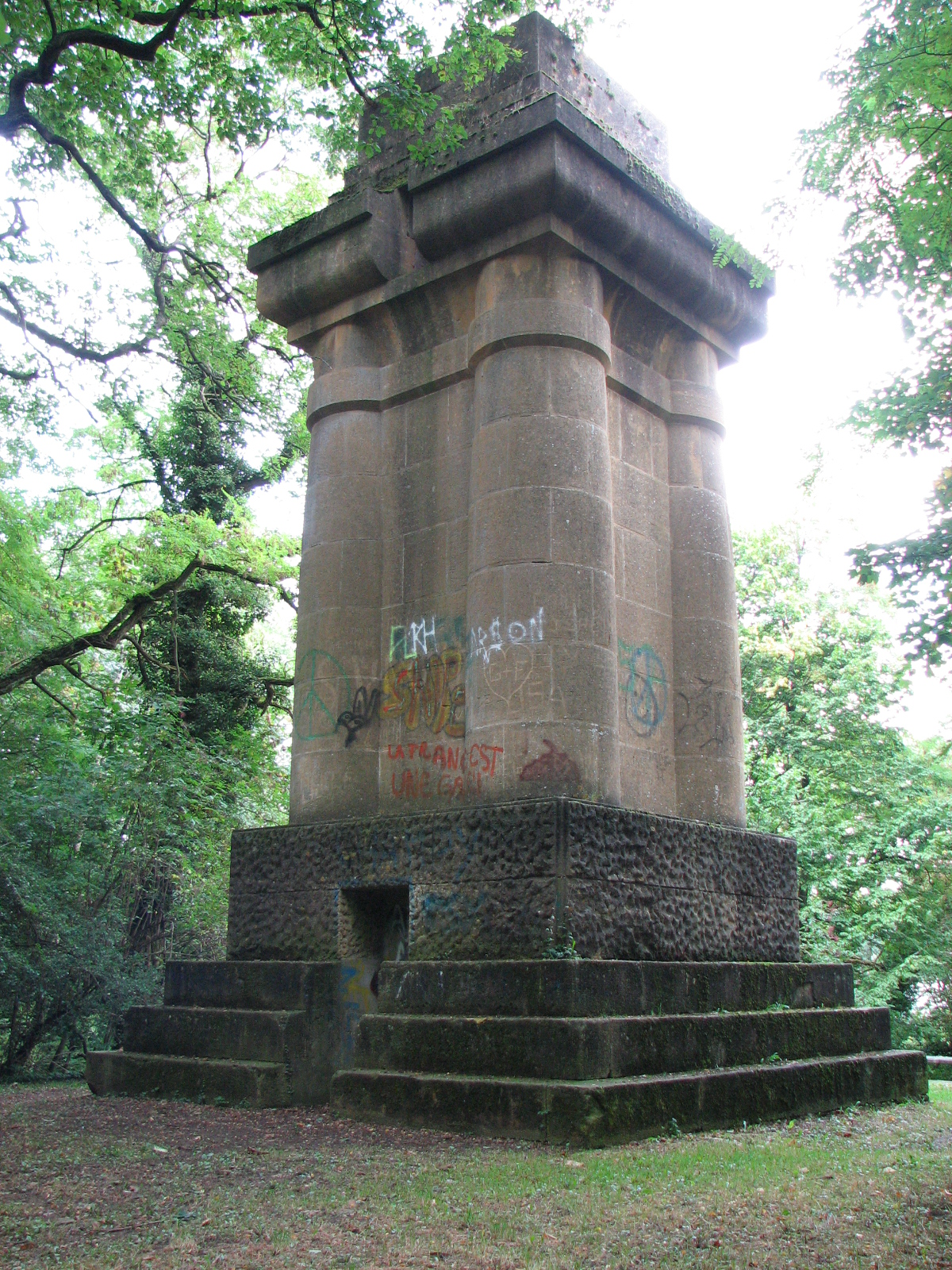
The only Bismarck tower on French soil, on Mont Saint-Quentin, Le Ban-Saint-Martin, Moselle, near Metz

The sole surviving Bismarck tower in France is in the commune of Le Ban-Saint-Martin near Metz. The tower was erected in 1902 when the area was part of Alsace-Lorraine, a Reichsland of the German Empire. Though accessible to modern-day visitors, the Bismarck Tower of Metz is in a semi-ruined state, damaged by vandals and weathering.

== History ==
The construction of a Bismarck tower in or around Metz was first proposed in the winter of 1898-1899 by one Lieutenant-Colonel Winterfeld, whose unit was then stationed in the area. Donations were solicited by a special committee, and on 1 April 1901 (Bismarck's birthday) the foundation stone was laid down. For security reasons (as a border town, Metz was one of the most fortified cities in Germany), the tower was not allowed to be constructed at the summit of Mont Saint-Quentin, but rather on its southeastern slope.

The tower was inaugurated exactly one year later, on 1 April 1902, attended by various military and civilian leaders. At 8 pm that same evening, the first fire was lit on the tower.

== Construction and design ==
The Metz Bismarck Tower is 13.5 metres (44 ft) tall, and is one of the first Bismarck towers to be built in the Götterdämmerung style conceptualised by Wilhelm Kreis (squat construction, with a fire beacon at the top). It is thus very similar in design to its sister tower in Stuttgart (1904).

Construction works were carried out by the firm Haase & Schott from Metz. The exterior of the tower is made out of limestone. There is a sandstone relief of Bismarck on the side of the tower facing the town, now riddled with bullet holes. At the top of the tower was a large square brazier upon which fires could be lit on certain festive occasions.

After the tower was opened, there was a proposal by the local newspaper, the Metzer Zeitung, to rename Mont St-Quentin to the Bismarck-Höhe, but the idea was ultimately rejected.

== Contemporary situation ==
French troops reoccupied Metz in November 1918, after the German defeat in World War I. Alsace-Lorraine was returned to France in 1919. That same year the French authorities removed the brazier from the tower. It was also around this time that the relief of Bismarck was defaced.

Damage to the tower had been noted as early as 1906, when the Vosges Club and Beautification Association recorded fire damage to the column (burnt bricks on the observation deck) and rust on the iron staircase. Renovations were carried out intermittently until early 1914. The tower was effectively abandoned after French sovereignty was restored to the region.

Although officially closed since 2001, tourists may still visit the tower. The structure is currently in need of restoration. More than a century of weathering, wartime damage, and graffiti have taken their toll on the exterior; as of August 2012 it is in a semi-ruined state, covered by dense vegetation.
