= Bismarck Tower (Ballenstedt) =

Bismarck tower
Type:	Viewing tower
Country:	Germany
Bundesland:	Saxony-Anhalt
Location:	Ballenstedt
Site:	on the Stahlsberg
Geo-coordinates:	51°42′51.5″N 11°15′32.3″E
Site elevation:	270.6 m above sea level (NN)
Tower height:	ca. 11 m
Viewing platformheight:	ca. 280 m above NN
Construction period:	Phase 1: 1914/15; Phase 2: 1930/31

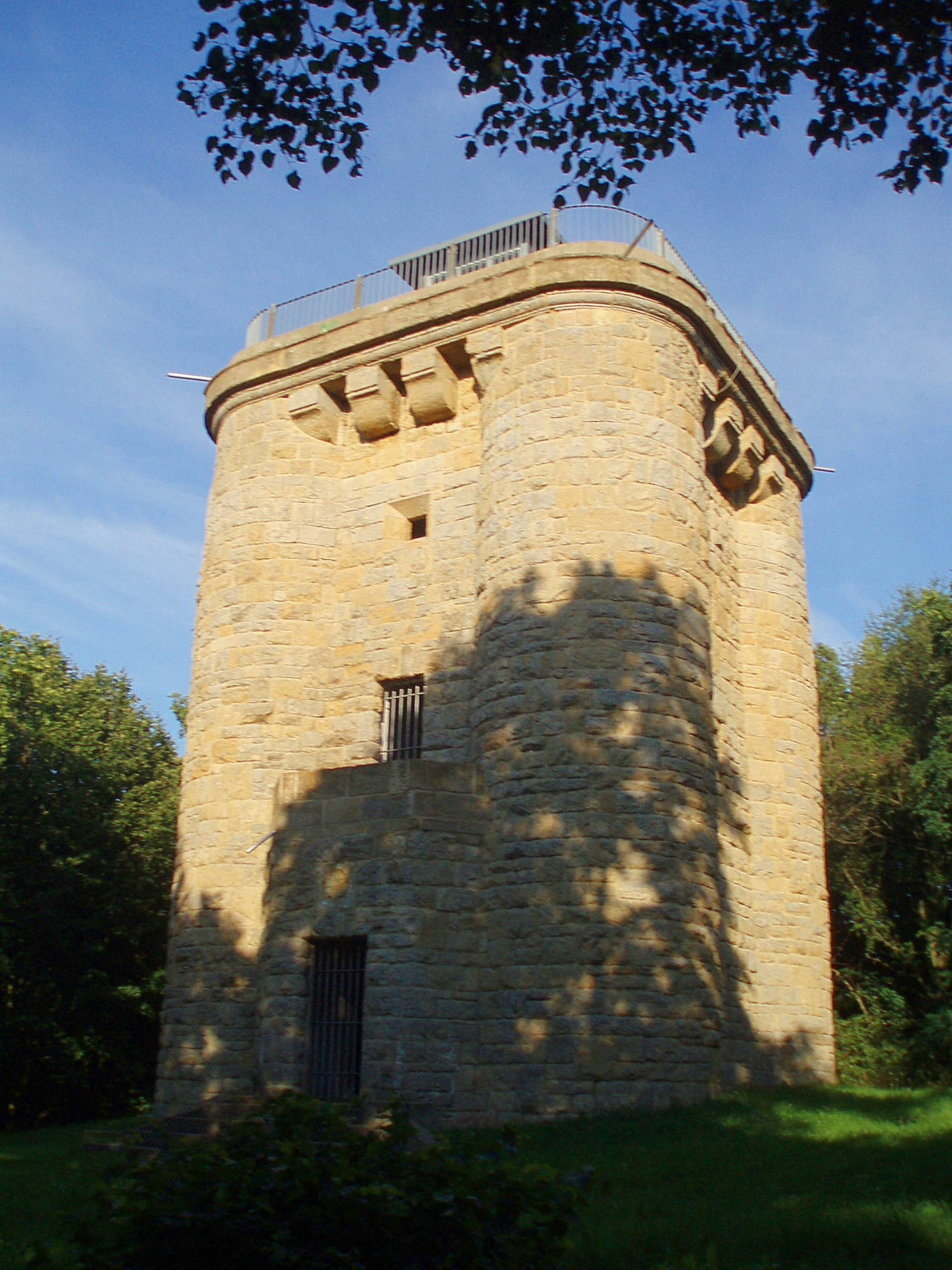
The Bismarck Tower near Ballenstedt

The Bismarck Tower (German: Bismarckturm) on the 268-metre (879 ft) high Stahlsberg above Opperode in Germany is a monument to the former German chancellor, Bismarck. Built in 1914/15, it can be used as an observation tower.

== Location ==
The tower is located in the Mansfeld Land region on the edge of the Harz/Saxony-Anhalt Nature Park. It stands on the Stahlsberg, a wooded hill ridge on the northeastern flank of the Harz Mountains in central Germany. The Stahlsberg rises immediately south of Opperode through which the Sauerbach stream flows. The tower lies within the borough of Ballenstedt.

== History ==
On the 100th anniversary of the Battle of Leipzig in 1913, Ballenstedt's lord mayor, Wendt, proposed the erection of a Bismarck tower. The tower committee that was formed to take this forward, selected the Stahlsberg hill near Opperode as the location and Professor Wilhelm Kreis as the architect. He decided on a tower that was extremely similar to his award-winning Götterdämmerung design.

The Bismarck Tower was made of limestone and granite from the nearby Harz Mountains. The laying of the foundation stone was celebrated on 14 June 1914, just before the outbreak of the First World War. During the war, work ground to a halt and it was not taken up again until the 1930s. From 1930 to early 1931 the tower was finished under the direction of the Ballenstedt branch of the Harz Club who went for a simpler shape. For example, they left out the planned brazier (Feuerschale) on the observation platform. On 20 May 1931 the tower was inaugurated in a modest ceremony.

After the Second World War and during East German times the tower fell into ruins. In 1994/95, after the end of the Cold War, the tower was restored and it re-opened on 1 July 1995.

The tower is about 11 metres high (it was originally planned to be 16.50 metres high). An inner staircase with 57 steps leads to a viewing platform at an elevation of around 280 m above NN.

== Walking and access ==
The Bismarck Tower is not permanently open as an observation tower. A key to the entrance door may be obtained from the tourist office in Ballenstedt (Touristik-Information Ballenstedt). The viewing platform offers views of the Harz Foreland, Ballenstedt and Opperode. The tower is No. 199 in the system of checkpoints in the Harzer Wandernadel hiking network.
