= Bismarck Tower (Freiburg im Breisgau) =

Bismarck Tower; Freiburg im Breisgau
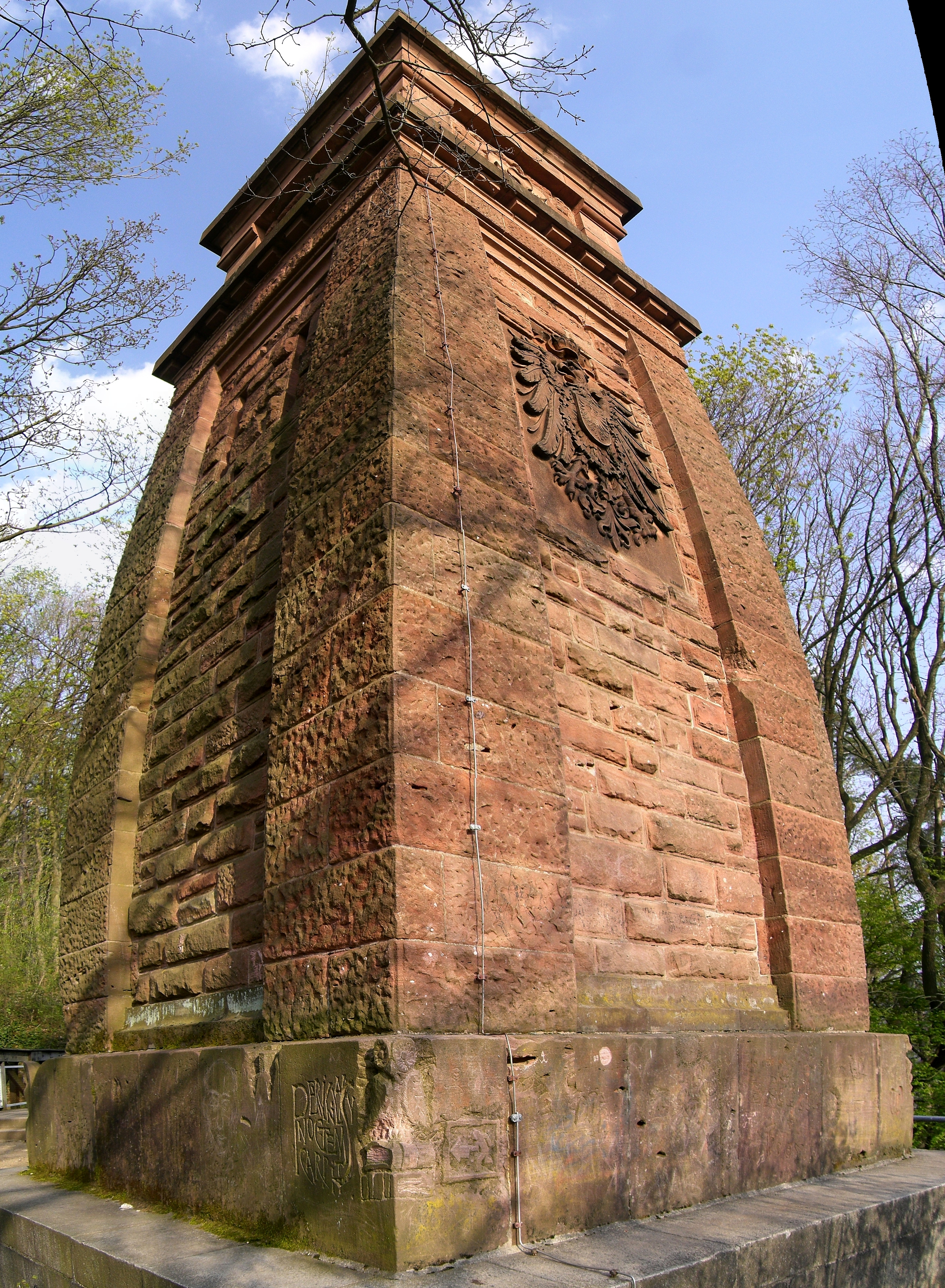

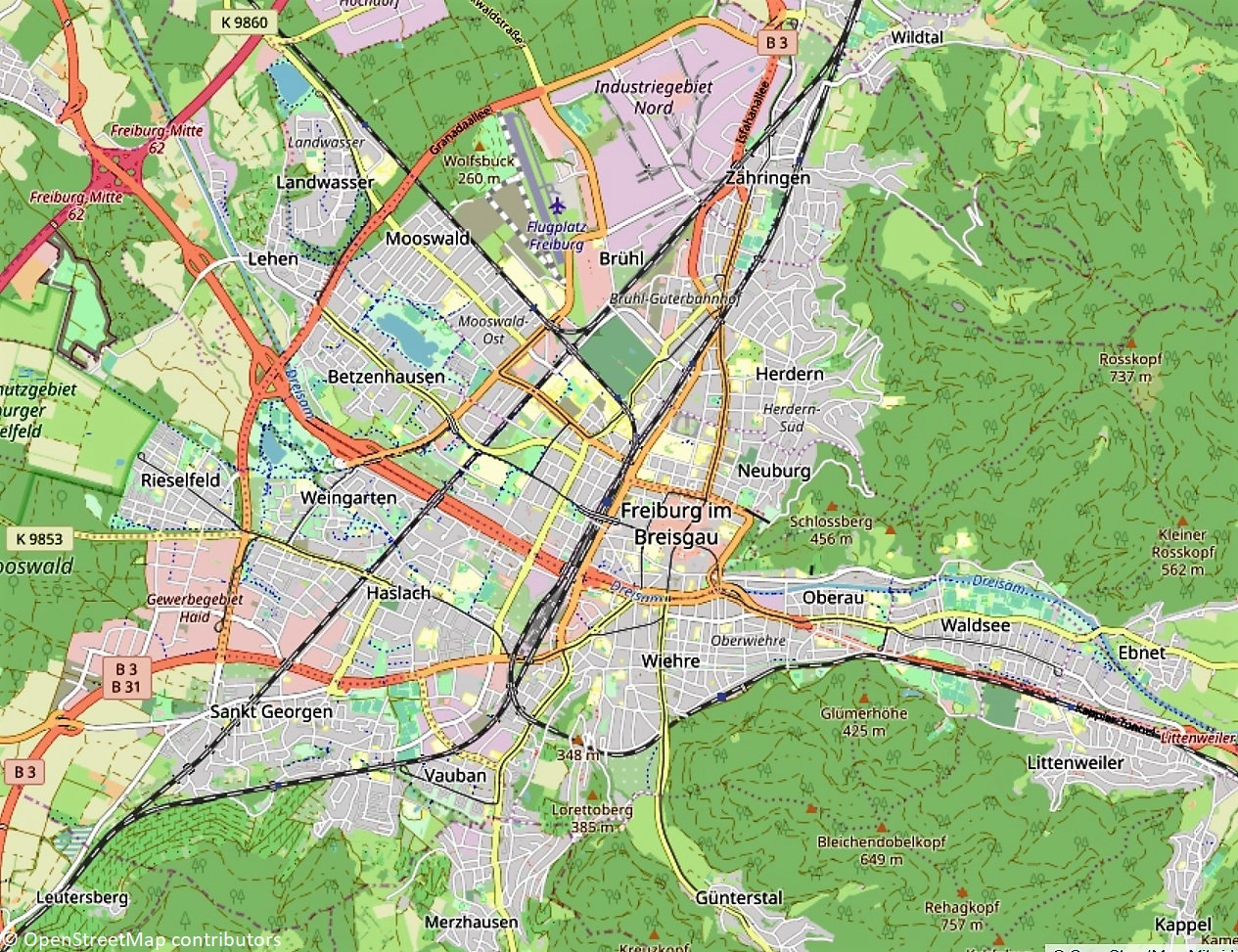
- Location in Freiburg Bismarck Tower (Freiburg im Breisgau) (Baden-Württemberg)
- 47°59′37.9″N 7°51′33.58″E
- Location: Schlossberg; Freiburg im Breisgau, Baden-Württemberg, Germany

History
- Year of Construction: 1899

Site notes
- Height: 12.6 m (41 ft)
- Architect: Oscar Geiges

The Bismarck tower in Freiburg im Breisgau belongs to a series of towers that were built in honor of Otto von Bismarck, the first Chancellor of the unified German state. It is located on the Schlossberg. It is 12.6 m (41 ft) tall and has a square base (5.8x5.8 m or 19x19 ft). The top of the tower can only be reached by climbing a ladder. Because of this it can not be used as an observation deck.

== History ==
Back in February 1899, first plans about the construction of a memorial were made. The Prorector of the University of Freiburg Gustav Steinmann as well as the studentry and the city administration were involved. The city council decided to support the plan but did not grant any financial help. The aim of the city administration was to create a monument as well as an attractive lookout for citizens and tourists. The initial plan to build the memorial at Ludwigshöhe was denied by the city administration and today's location was chosen as a trade-off. The construction started on 28 February 1899. The building cost of 16,500 Mark was financed with donations by the Students and the Zaringia choir as well as a loan by the student service. Architect Oscar Geiges' design was chosen over more than 30 other designs that were submitted. The tower was inaugurated on July 28, 1900. Since then it is property of the University of Freiburg.

== Design ==
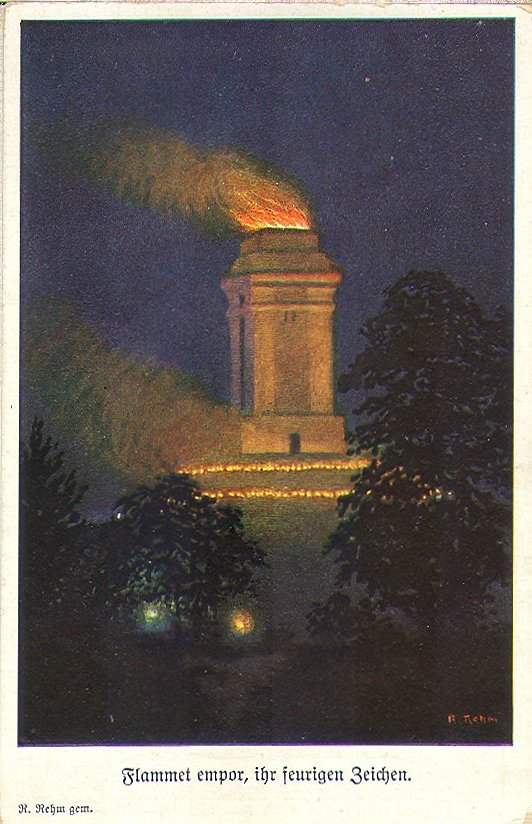
Original concept art for the Götterdämmerung design by Wilhelm Kreis

Oscar Geiges' blueprint was based on the popular design concept Götterdämmerung by Wilhelm Kreis. This concept also included the plan to kindle a bonfire on top of all Bismarck towers on special occasions such as the 1st of April, Bismarck's birthday. A staircase to the tower was not implemented. An iron ladder is the only way to access the top of the tower or the fire pits. For this reason the originally planned use as a view point for tourists had to be abstained from. A relief of the Reichsadler by Anton Viesel and the crest of the House of Bismarck can be found on the city facing side of the tower. On the mountain facing side exists aside from the entrance also a memorial plaque.

== Bibliography ==
Scherb, Ute. "Wir Bekommen Die Denkmäler, Die Wir Verdienen": Freiburger Monumente Im 19. Und 20. Jahrhundert. Stadtarchiv Freiburg, 2005.

Seele, Sieglinde. Lexikon Der Bismarck-Denkmäler: Türme, Standbilder, Büsten, Gedenksteine Und Andere Ehrungen; Eine Bestandaufnahme in Wort Und Bild; Michael Imhof Publishing, 2005.
