= Hermann Feuerhahn =

German sculptor

Wilhelm August Hermann Feuerhahn (20 May 1873 in Bönnien, Landkreis Marienburg (Hannover), Province of Hanover – 19 April 1941) was a German sculptor particularly known for his architectural sculpture.

== Life and achievements ==
Several of his works were created together with Georg Roch and are jointly attributed to Feuerhahn & Roch.

In 1905, Feuerhahn founded the Workshops for Cemetery Art together with Hugo Lederer, Georg Wrba and other sculptors. There, they designed gravestones that were marketed on the basis of type construction with simple modifications.

Feuerhahn died in Berlin at the age of 77.

== Work ==
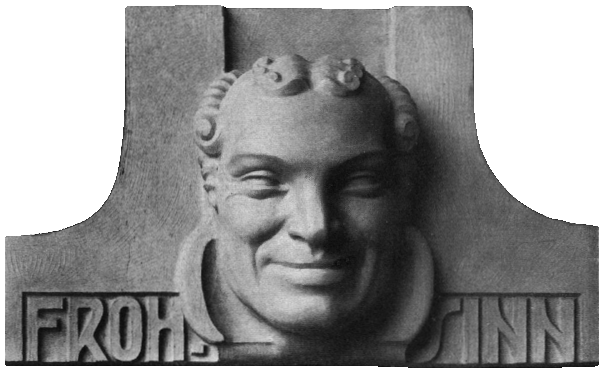
Frohsinn (from the series Temperamente) in Stadttheater Bremerhaven (1910)

- 1906–1910: Building sculpture at the Theater Freiburg.
- 1909: Sculpture work on the Berliner Postscheckamt (design Alfred Lempp, Implementing the building sculpture with Christoph Hasselwander).
- 1909: Sculpture work on the Hebbel Theater in Berlin (architect: Oskar Kaufmann).
- 1911–1912: Sculptural decoration of the façades and interiors of the Stadttheater Bremerhaven (with Georg Roch; architect: Oskar Kaufmann).
- 1914/1915: Sculptural ornamentation (masks on the parapets) for the Gerickesteg over the Spree in Berlin (with Georg Roch)
- 1915–1917: Donor plaques for the Bismarckturm in Burg im Spreewald (with Georg Roch)
