= Bismarck Tower (Aachen) =

Coordinates: 50°44′48″N 6°6′23″E

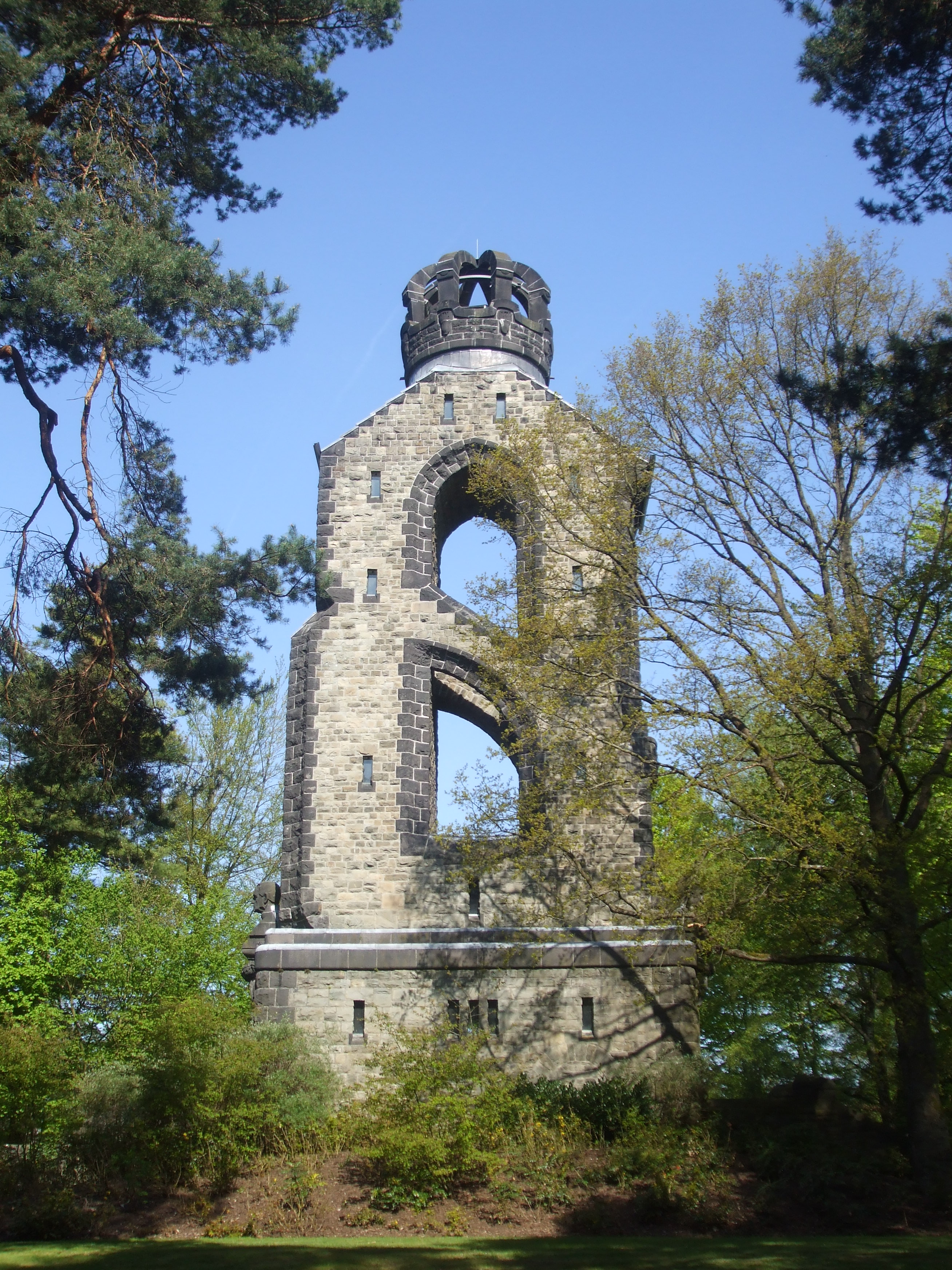
- Bismarck Tower (Aachen) 2008
- Interactive map of Bismarck Tower
- Location: Aachen
- Designer: Georg Frentzen
- Type: Bismarck Tower
- Height: 9.8 m (32 ft)
- Beginning date: 22 July 1907
- Dedicated to: Otto von Bismarck

The Aachen Bismarck Tower is one of 173 still-standing towers and columns (of the 240 originally built), which were constructed in the German Empire between 1869 and 1934 to commemorate the founder of the German state, Otto von Bismarck (1815-1898).

== History ==
As with most Bismarck towers and columns, the Aachen Bismarck Tower also had its beginning at the beginning of the 20th century. On 22 July 1907, through the efforts of the then mayor Philipp Veltman, the tower's construction was initiated. The idea for this project originated with the student society at RWTH Aachen. To realize the project, the committee came together with some influential Aachen citizens, under the chairmanship of retired Gerichtsassessor Robert Oskar Julius von Görschen (1829-1914). On 26 April 1904 the city council voted to support construction under the motto "...des nationalen Gedankens wegen wie auch der Festigung und Erhaltung der Eintracht unserer Stadt“, which translates roughly to, "To the idea of nationhood, as well as for the strengthening and preservation of the unity of our city". It was also in commemoration of the fact that Otto von Bismarck served as a government clerk in Aachen before he entered politics.

== Description ==
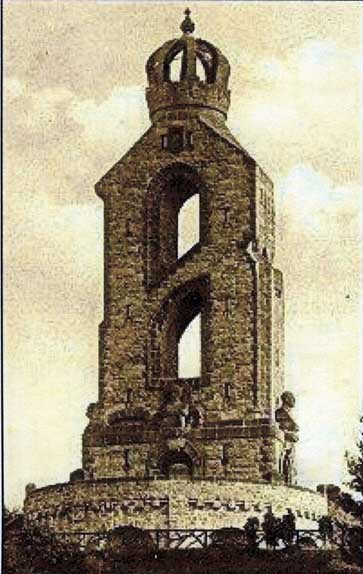
Bismarck tower 1910

The Aachen Bismarck Tower was designed by Georg Frentzen (1854-1923), and was built after obtaining permission from the company Boswau & Knauer in Berlin. The tower is semicircular, with a base around five meters high, which is divided into five identical segments with two staircases. A one-meter high stone parapet sits above it and is supported by multi-part frieze battlements. Above the base level, there is an axially-symmetrical lower level that is roughly eleven meters high and which contains three arched portals. Above the portals are basalt busts of Otto von Bismarck, Helmuth Karl Bernhard von Moltke, and Albrecht von Roon, which were designed by Prof. Karl Krauss. Above the lower level sits the actual tower, 9.8 meters high, square and made up of four stories, arranged in the stylized form of the letter "B". The tower is topped by an observation deck, reachable by two staircases. The topmost segment of the monument consists of a 5 Meter high ducal crown originally constructed with a mounted Globus cruciger, instead of the customary brazier normally associated with Bismarck towers. Directly below the ducal crown, Bismarck's coat of arms are attached. The Globus cruciger meanwhile can no longer be seen, as it was possibly removed for renovation before 1986.

The Bismarck Tower has always been popular as a lookout, and after the last renovation work between 1999 and 2005, it remains accessible and still serves as a popular destination for the public. It is located in a cemetery in Burtscheid.
