= Wilkanowo Tower =

Coordinates: 51°54′55″N 15°27′33″E

- Wieża Wilkanowska
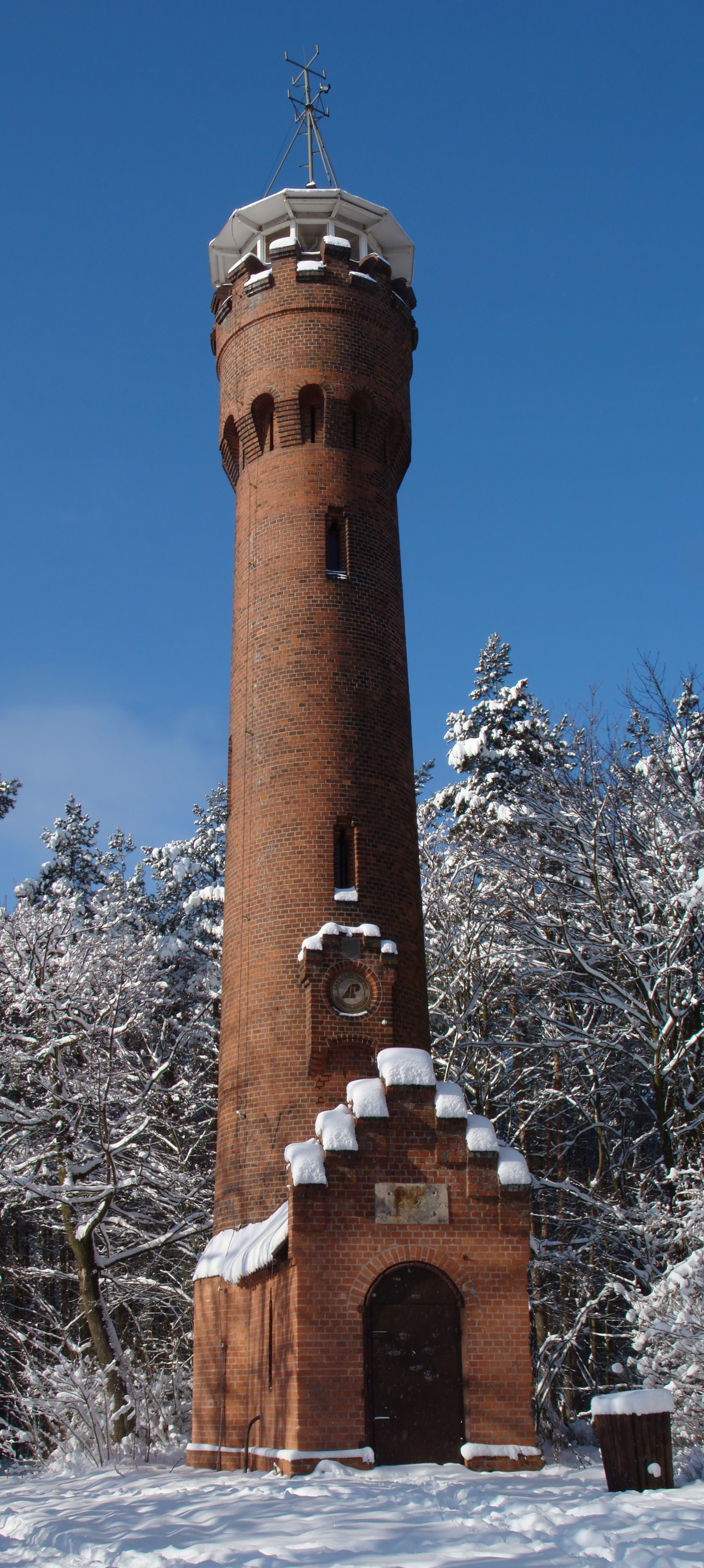
- Interactive map of Wilkanowo Tower
- Location: Wilkanowo, Poland
- Designer: Albert Severin
- Type: Bismarck Tower
- Material: Bricks
- Height: 20 m (66 ft)
- Beginning date: 1 April 1902
- Opening date: 23 August 1902
- Restored date: 2003
- Dedicated to: Otto von Bismarck

The Wilkanowo Tower (Polish: Wieża Wilkanowska), until 1945 the Grünberg Bismarck Tower (German: Bismarckturm in Grünberg), is a historical observation tower and cultural heritage site in Wilkanowo, Poland, 6 km southwest of Zielona Góra. It is one of the best-preserved Bismarck towers outside of present-day Germany. It is still in use as an observation tower and radio mast.

== History ==
The tower was proposed by architect Albert Severin, with the support of the Grünberg Commercial and Horticultural Association. The club purchased a plot of land on the Meiseberg (Góra Wilkanowska), outside the village of Wittgenau (Wilkanowo), for construction of the tower. The foundation stone was laid on 1 April 1902 (Bismarck's birthday); construction was carried out by local master mason Carl Mühle.

The tower was completed in just four months at a cost of 6,000 marks; it was inaugurated on 23 August 1902. Above the entrance was a relief of Otto von Bismarck, and the inscription "ERECTED IN 1902/COMMERCIAL AND HORTICULTURAL ASSOCIATION OF GRÜNBERG".

== Description ==
The tower is 20 m high and stands atop Wilkanowska Hill, 221 m above sea level. It is built entirely from bricks, with crenellations at the top.

== Contemporary situation ==
After Germany's defeat in World War II, Wilkanowo was transferred to Poland. There was little fighting in the area during the war, and so the tower emerged unscathed.

As of April 1992, all references to Bismarck were removed; however there is currently a sign above the entrance in place of the old German inscription. In Polish, it reads "BISMARCK TOWER - AUTHORITIES OF ZIELONA GÓRA - AD 1902". The elevation of the tower is also mentioned.

Unlike other crumbling Bismarck towers beyond the present-day German borders, the Zielona Góra Tower is in excellent condition, having been restored in 2003, and is still used for multiple purposes: a fire lookout tower, weather vane, observation tower, and communications mast. In good weather, it is open to the public for a small fee.
