= Bismarck Tower (Salzgitter) =

Observation tower in Salzgitter, Germany

Coordinates: 52°03′42″N 10°21′28″E

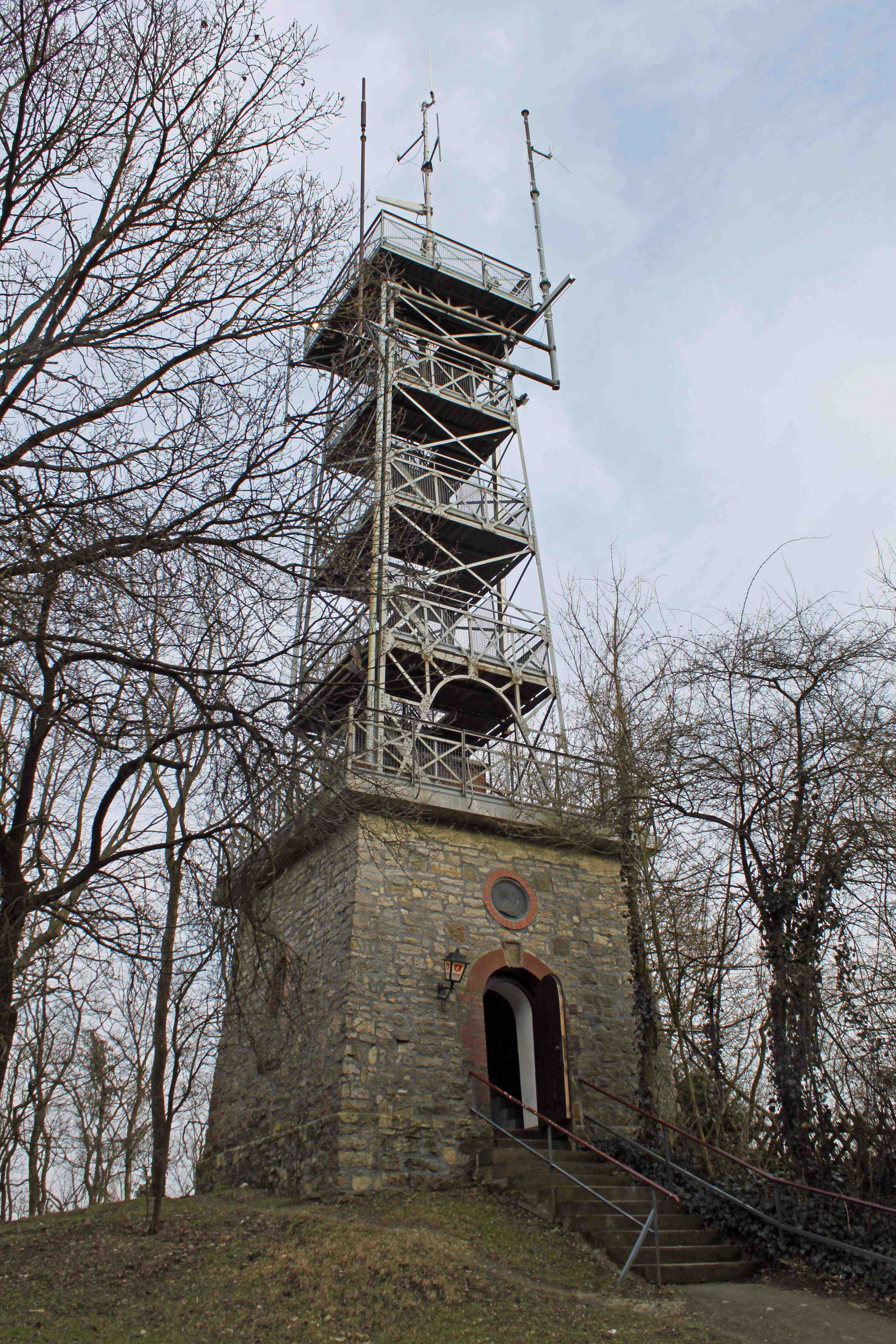
Salzgitter Bismarck Tower

The Salzgitter Bismarck Tower is an observation tower completed in 1900 in Salzgitter, Germany. Unlike most other Bismarck towers, it does not consist of all-stone design, but instead has a base of bricks with a lattice tower on top. On one side, it resembles an Eiffel Tower with a bow between its feet. The Harz Club voted to build the Bismarck Tower at Salzgitter on 8 May 1899. The same day, the site was chosen and bought by the forest cooperative of Gitter. On 10 September 1899, construction started.

The work was carried out by Hoenerbach of Salzgitter and the Weule/Alt engineering company. As the construction licence was not awarded until 12 January 1900, the tower was not finished until 12 August 1900. On 21 July 1900 it was decided to establish a Bismarck museum. Until 1965, a 2-metre-high (6.6 ft) victory trophy was displayed at the entrance. The tower was renovated in 1990 and 2002.

== See also ==
- List of towers
