= Marly, Moselle =

Marly
- Commune
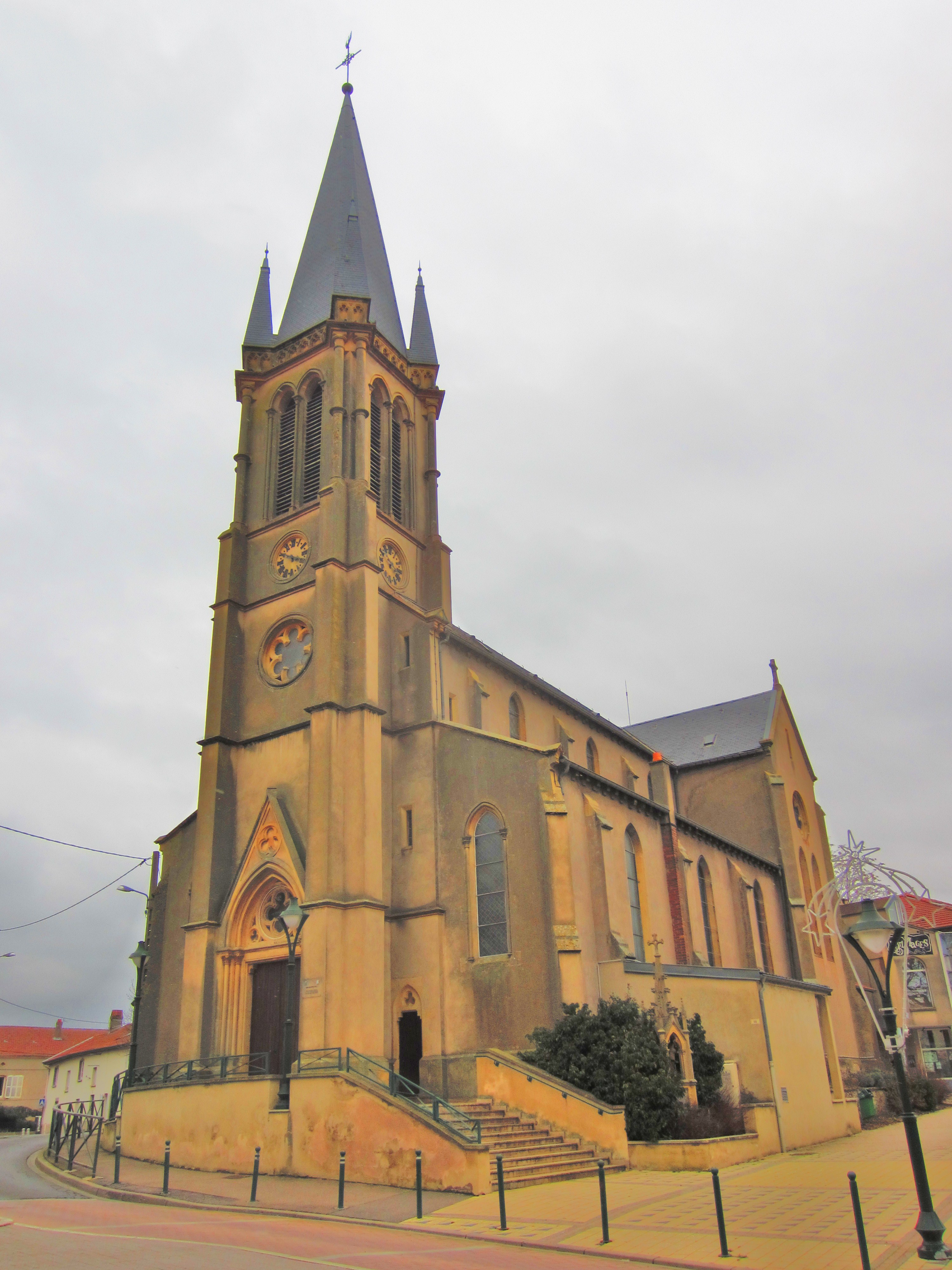
- The church in Marly

- Coat of arms
- Location of Marly
- Location within France Location within Grand Est
- Coordinates: 49°03′36″N 6°09′14″E
- Country: France
- Region: Grand Est
- Department: Moselle
- Arrondissement: Metz
- Canton: Montigny-lès-Metz
- Intercommunality: Metz Métropole

Government
  - Mayor (2020–2026): Thierry Hory
- Area^{1}: 11.00 km^{2} (4.25 sq mi)
- Highest elevation: 201 m (659 ft)
- Lowest elevation: 167 m (548 ft)
- Population (2023): 10,286
  - Density: 935.1/km^{2} (2,422/sq mi)
- Demonym: Marlien(ne)s
- Time zone: UTC+01:00 (CET)
  - Summer (DST): UTC+02:00 (CEST)
- INSEE/Postal code: 57447 /57155
- Website: www.marly57.fr
- ^{1} French Land Register data, which excludes lakes, ponds, glaciers > 1 km^{2} (0.386 sq mi or 247 acres) and river estuaries.

Marly (French pronunciation: [maʁli]; German: Marleien, 1940-44: Marlingen) is a commune in the Moselle department in Grand Est in north-eastern France.

It is situated 7 km south of the city of Metz, capital of the Moselle department.

== Population ==
Historical population
Year	Pop.	±% p.a.
1968	2,014	—
1975	6,100	+17.15%
1982	9,490	+6.52%
1990	9,511	+0.03%
1999	10,139	+0.71%
2007	9,624	−0.65%
2012	9,829	+0.42%
2017	10,104	+0.55%
2023	10,286	+0.30%
Source: INSEE

== See also ==
- Communes of the Moselle department
