= Bismarck tower =

German monument

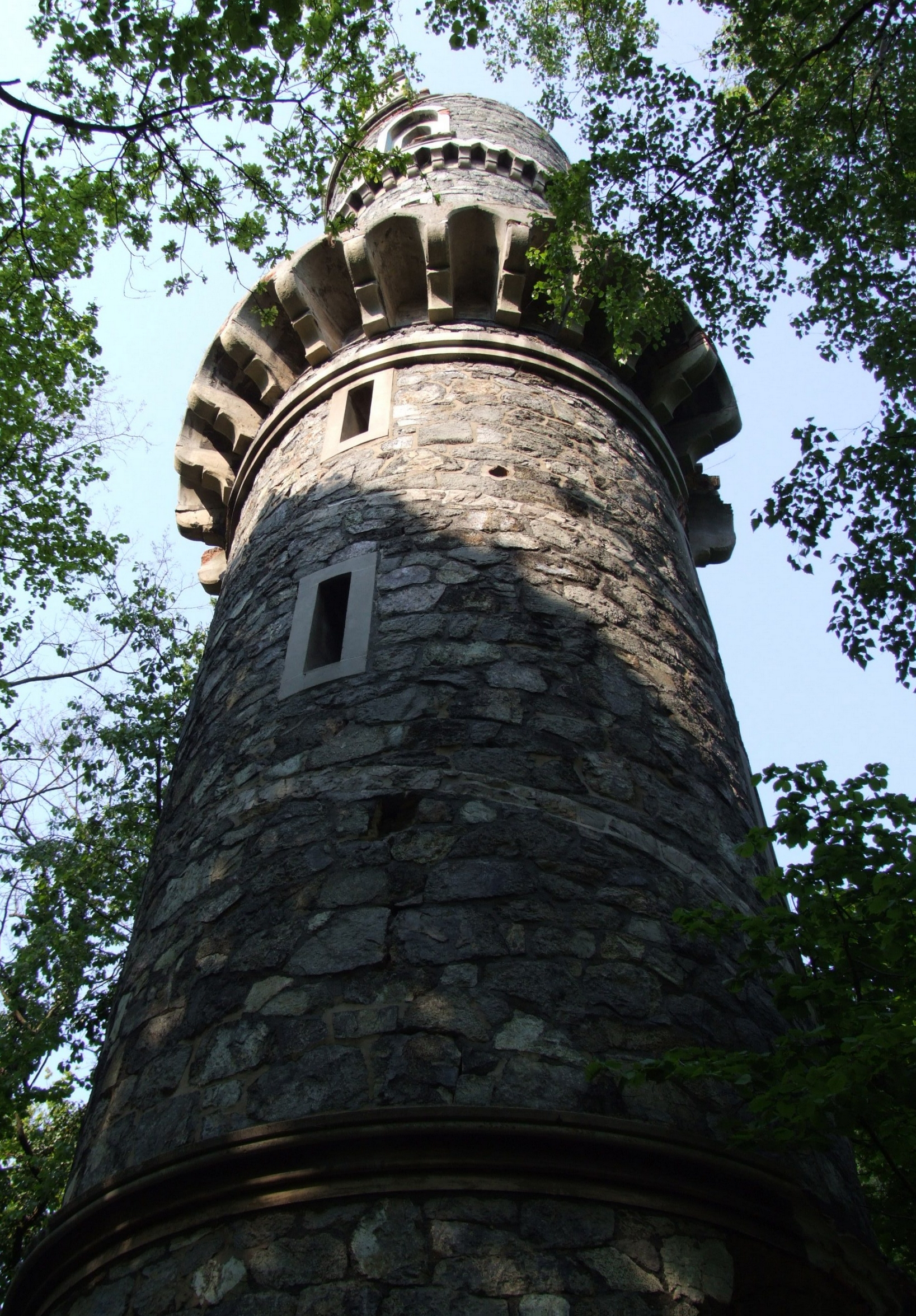
First Bismarck Tower in Janówek, Poland (formerly Ober-Johnsdorf, Lower Silesia, Germany), built in 1869

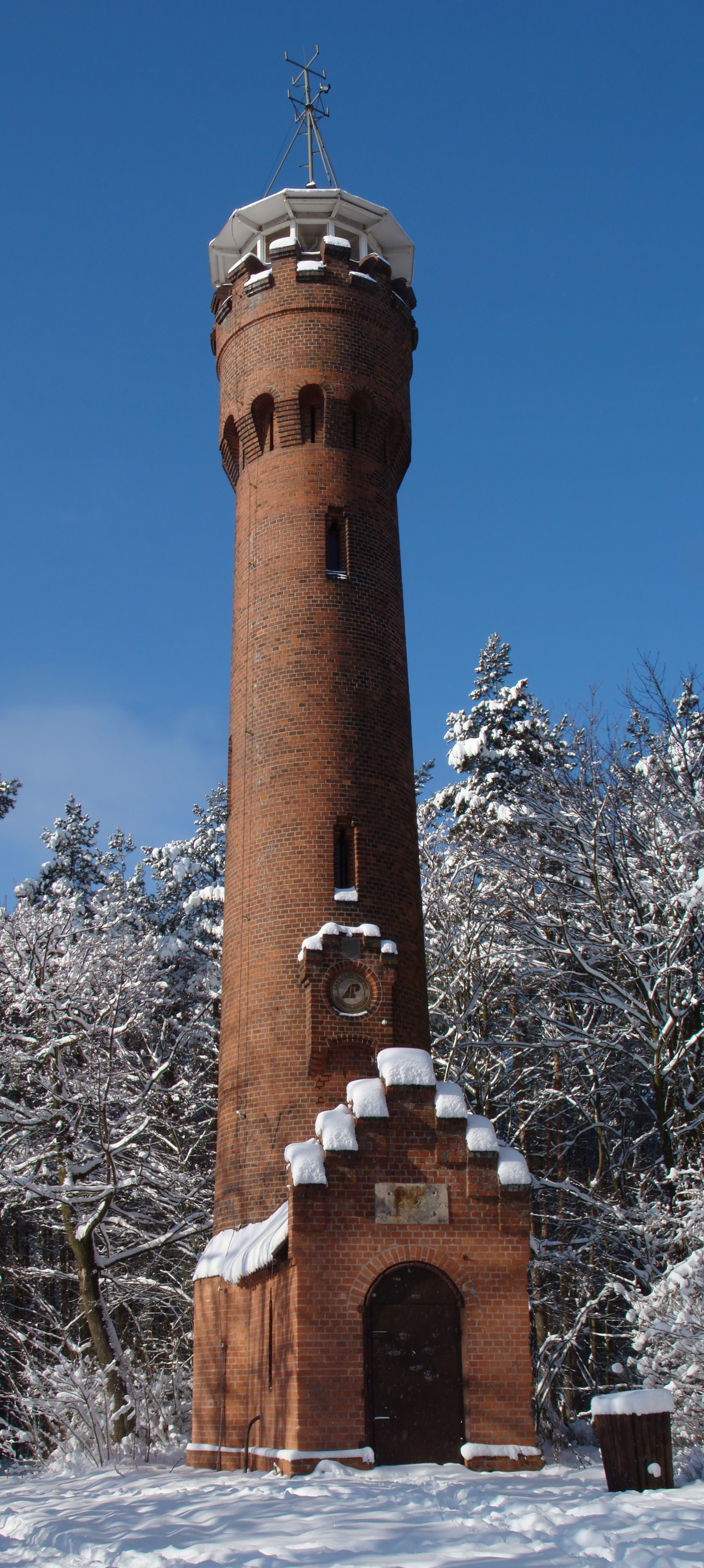
Bismarck Tower in Zielona Góra (formerly Grünberg, Silesia, Germany)

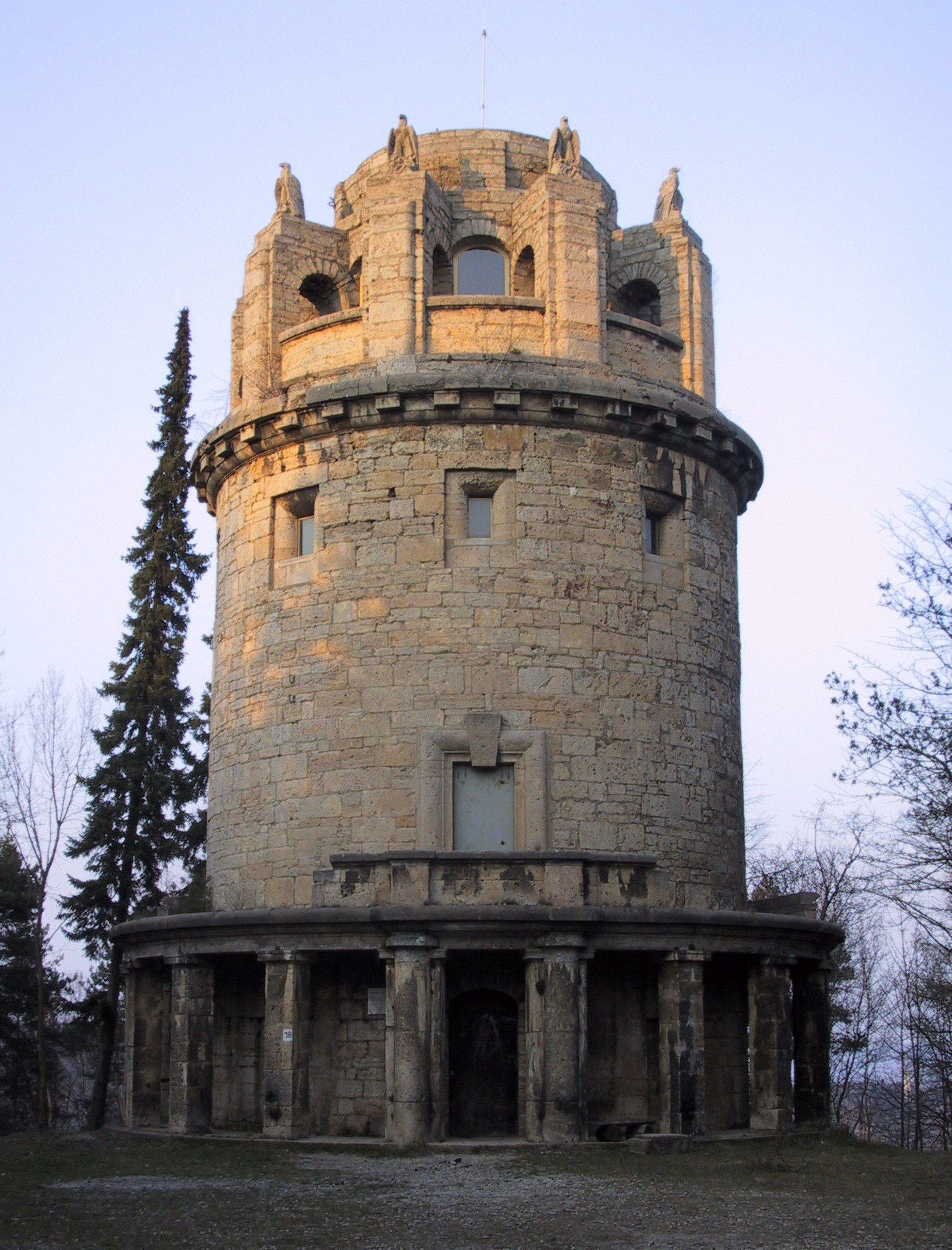
1909 Bismark tower in Jena

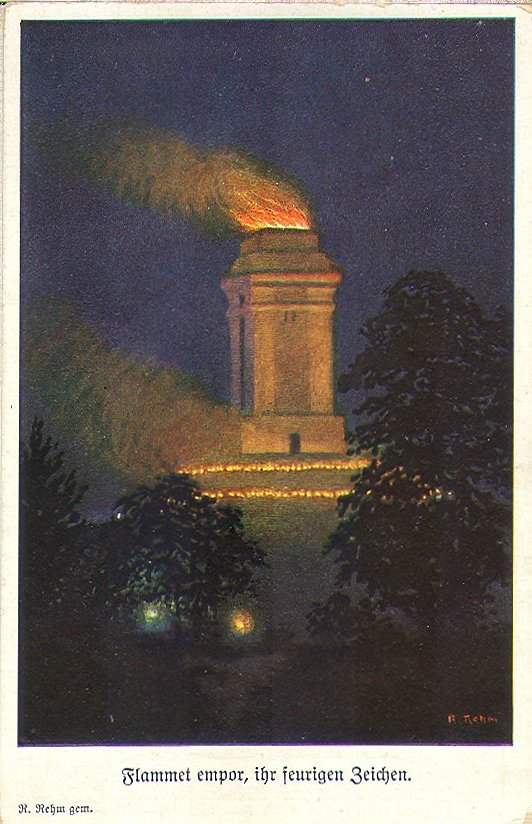
Illuminated Götterdämmerung tower

A Bismarck tower (German: Bismarckturm) is a specific type of monument built according to a more or less standard model across Germany to honour its first chancellor, Otto von Bismarck (d. 1898). A total of 234 of these towers were inventoried by Kloss and Seele in 2007 but more have been discovered since, making the total around 240. These towers were built between 1869 and 1934 and some 173 remain today. Quite a few of these towers, including all 47 based on Wilhelm Kreis's Götterdämmerung design, were built as so-called Bismarck columns (Bismarcksäulen) or were converted into them. This description goes back to the Student Union's competition held in 1899, which was to encourage the erection of as many beacons as possible (and not observation towers). But other Bismarck towers, e.g., those that were purely beacons with no observation function, were often called Bismarck columns.

== History ==
The first Bismarck tower was built in present-day Janówek, Poland. It was erected by private initiative in 1869 in the village of Ober-Johnsdorf, Silesia, then part of Prussia, now Janówek, Poland. It stands on top of the hill now called Jańska Góra (German: Johnsberg), 253 m above sea level. The tower itself is 23 m in height. The sponsor was the retired Prussian officer Friedrich Schröter (1820–1888), a wealthy landowner in nearby Wättrisch.

One year after Bismarck's death, German Studentenverbindung fraternities chose one of the designs submitted by the architect Wilhelm Kreis in an 1899 architecture competition. The award-winning Götterdämmerung fire column design of granite or sandstone was selected as a standard model for all Bismarck towers. The massive and squat design could be built to different heights and widths depending on the amount of money donated for the particular monument.

In manifestation of the Bismarck cult, they were built in various styles in locations across the German Empire, including its colonies in New Guinea (Gazelle Peninsula), Cameroon (near Limbe) and Tanzania, as well as in areas of Europe that, at the time, were part of Germany, but now lie within the borders of Poland, France, Denmark or Russia. Bismarck towers were also built in Austria, the Czech Republic, and Chile.

Every Bismarck tower was intended as a beacon, with their braziers lit on specified days in honour of the former chancellor to commemorate his achievement in unifying Germany in 1871. Though most towers included firing installations, plans for a nationwide beaconing failed, and many local initiatives chose deviating designs. The architects of these towers included Wilhelm Kreis himself, who built 58 (47 to the Götterdämmerung design), and Bruno Schmitz.

== Bismarck towers (selection) ==
- Aachen, finished in 1907
- Bad Kissingen, 1930
- Ballenstedt, 1930/31
- Burg (Spreewald), completed 1917
- Bydgoszcz, Poland, blown up in 1928
- Freiburg im Breisgau, completed 1900
- Hanover, finished in 1904, dismantled in 1935
- Háj near Aš (Hainberg bei Asch), Czech Republic, completed 1903
- Heidelberg, finished in 1903
- Janówek (Ober-Johnsdorf), Poland - the first Bismarck tower, finished in 1869
- Kallstadt
- Metz, Le Ban-Saint-Martin - the only preserved Bismarck tower in France
- Porta Westfalica, 1902, dismantled in 1952
- Salzgitter, 1900
- Szczecin (Stettin), Poland
- Viersen, 1901
- Wiesbaden, 1910 - with 50 m (160 ft) the highest tower, dismantled in 1918
- Zelená hora near Cheb (Eger), Czech Republic, completed 1909
- Zielona Góra (Grünberg), Poland
- Three Emperors' Corner, finished in 1907, dismantled in 1933 - at the confluence of the Black and White Przemsza rivers in the present-day Silesian Voivodeship of Poland. Until 1918, it marked the place at which the borders of three empires that had divided Poland – the Russian Empire, Austria-Hungary and the German Empire – met.
