= Canton of Montigny-lès-Metz =

Coordinates: 49.10°N 6.15°E

The canton of Montigny-lès-Metz is an administrative division of the Moselle department, northeastern France. Its borders were modified at the French canton reorganisation which came into effect in March 2015. Its seat is in Montigny-lès-Metz.

It consists of the following communes:

1. Le Ban-Saint-Martin
2. Longeville-lès-Metz
3. Marly
4. Montigny-lès-Metz
5. Plappeville
6. Scy-Chazelles
