= Bismarck Tower (Burg (Spreewald)) =

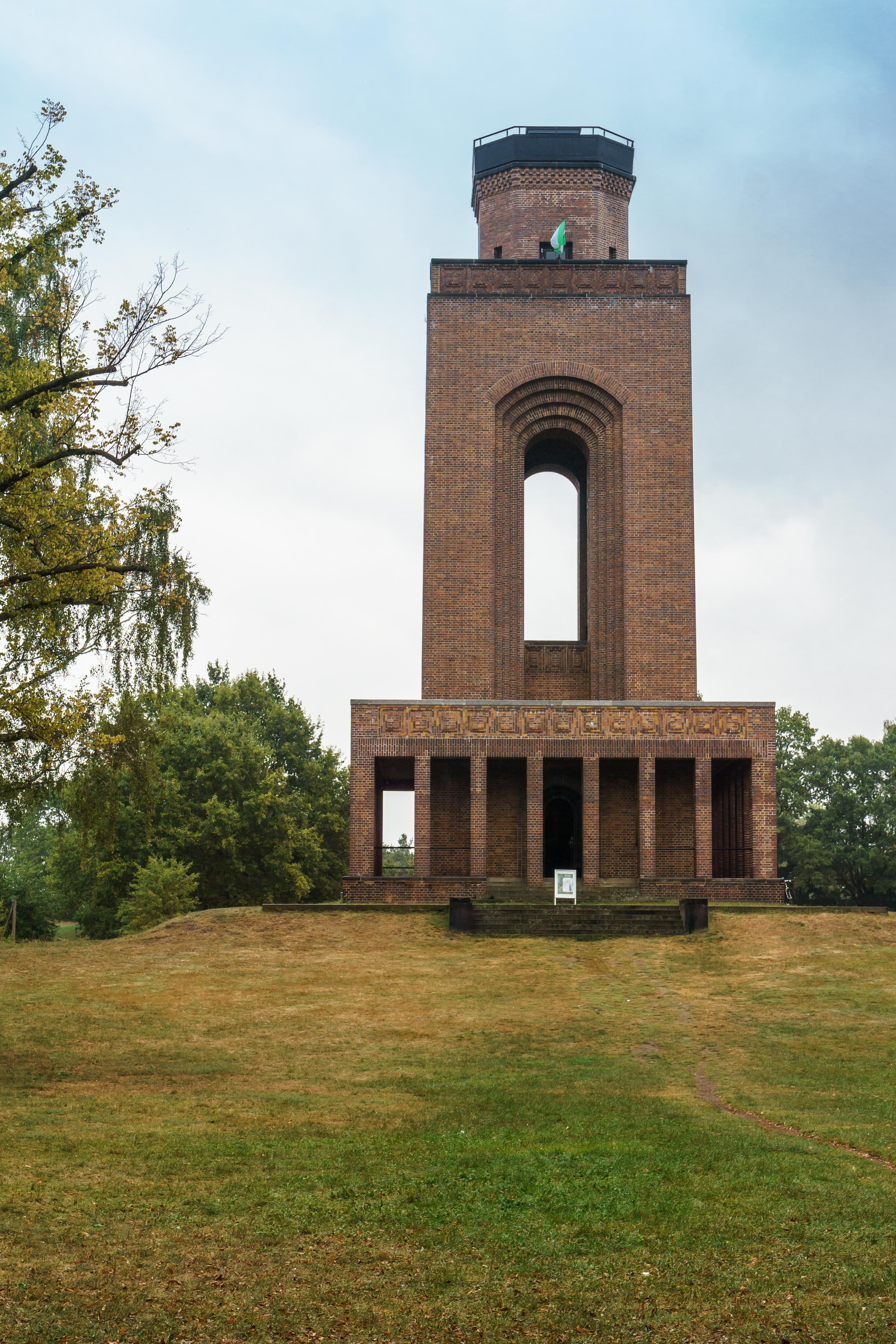
Bismarck Tower in Burg (Spreewald)

The Bismarckturm ("Bismarck Tower") is a 28 metre high Bismarck monument. It is located on the Schlossberg north of Burg (Spreewald).

== Architecture ==
About 1.5 million red clinker bricks were used for the construction. The building has a square base one meter high and an edge length of 13.77 meters. The first floor is square with an edge length of 9.35 metres. There is a memorial hall surrounded by 28 pillars. Above it is an octagonal dome. There are viewing platforms at heights of 5 and 18 metres respectively. In 1999 another exit was installed on the tower head, increasing the height of the tower from 27 to 28 meters.

== History ==
In 1900 there were first plans to build an observation tower near Burg. At that time, the decision was made for the Schlossberg as a location. In 1910 it was decided to build a Bismarck Tower and the initiators began to collect donations. Architect Bruno Möhring from Berlin was commissioned to create a design. The design was carried out by the Cottbus architect Hermann Hauke. The outbreak of the First World War delayed construction work, which only began in the spring of 1915 and lasted two years. The tower also became a memorial to the soldiers who died in the war. During the Third Reich, solstice celebrations were held on the site. In 1944 a military observation point was established on the tower. The Wehrmacht used the tower as a radio control centre. In 1945 the tower was prepared for demolition but this could be prevented. After 1945 "ideological components" - such as Bismarck's coat of arms and his bust - were removed. The fire bowl on the top of the tower was dismantled. In 1951 the tower was renamed the "Tower of Youth". Between 1950 and 1990 the tower was closed to the public for strategic military reasons. The tower was finally renamed "Bismarckturm" again on October 3, 1990 with a public festival and made accessible to the public again.
