= Wilkanowo, Lubusz Voivodeship =

Wilkanowo
- Village
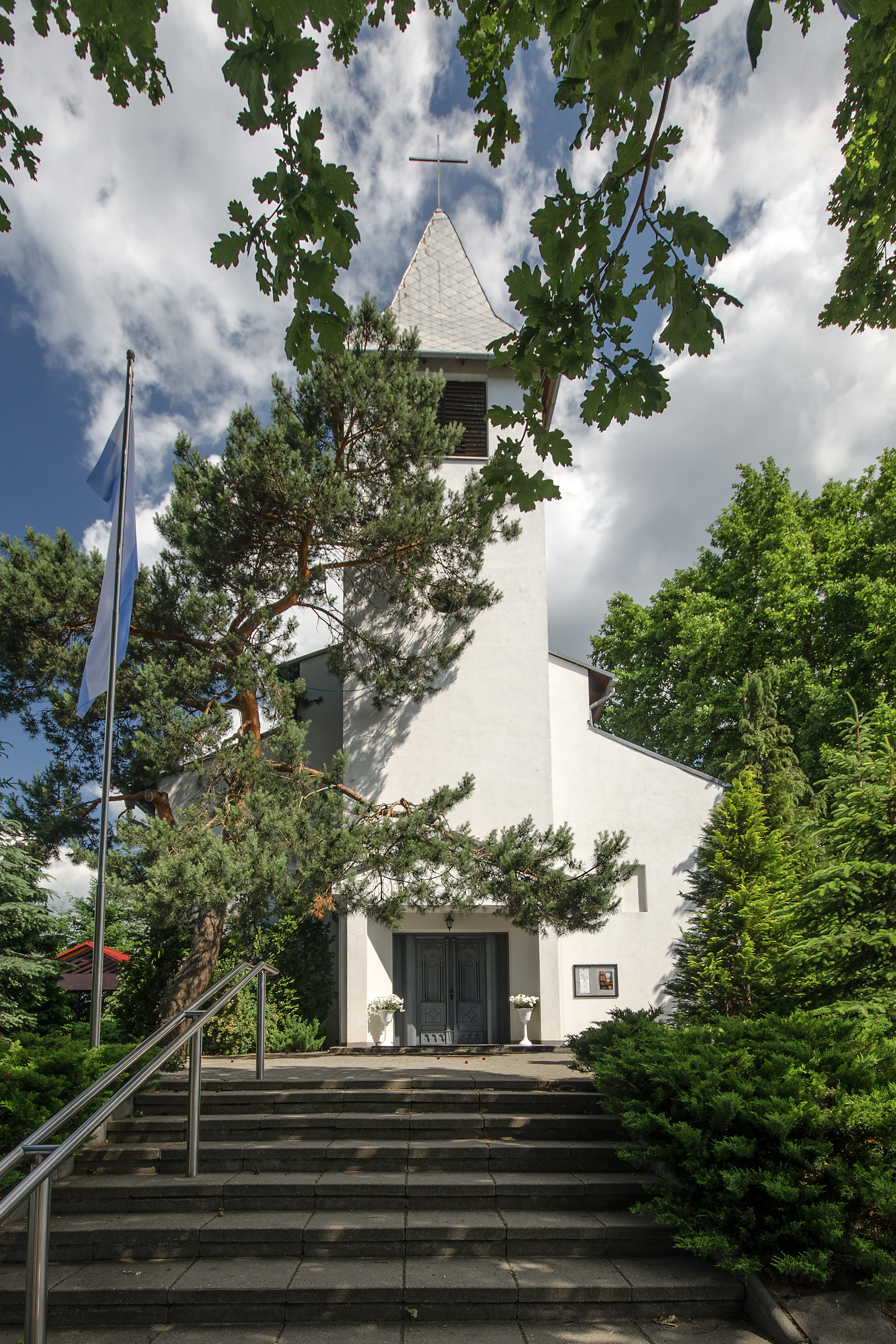
- Sacred Heart church in Wilkanowo

- Location within Poland
- Coordinates: 51°55′N 15°26′E
- Country: Poland
- Voivodeship: Lubusz
- County: Zielona Góra
- Gmina: Świdnica
- First mentioned: 1305
- Time zone: UTC+1 (CET)
  - Summer (DST): UTC+2 (CEST)
- Vehicle registration: FZI

Wilkanowo [vilkaˈnɔvɔ] is a village in the administrative district of Gmina Świdnica, within Zielona Góra County, Lubusz Voivodeship, in western Poland.

== History ==
The oldest known mention of the village comes from 1305, when it was part of Piast-ruled Poland.

In 1838, lignite deposits were discovered in the village.

== Sights ==
The Wilkanowska Tower is located in the village.
