= Moselle Valley =

Geographical region in Belgium, France, Germany and Luxembourg

Coordinates: 50.1°N 7.1°E

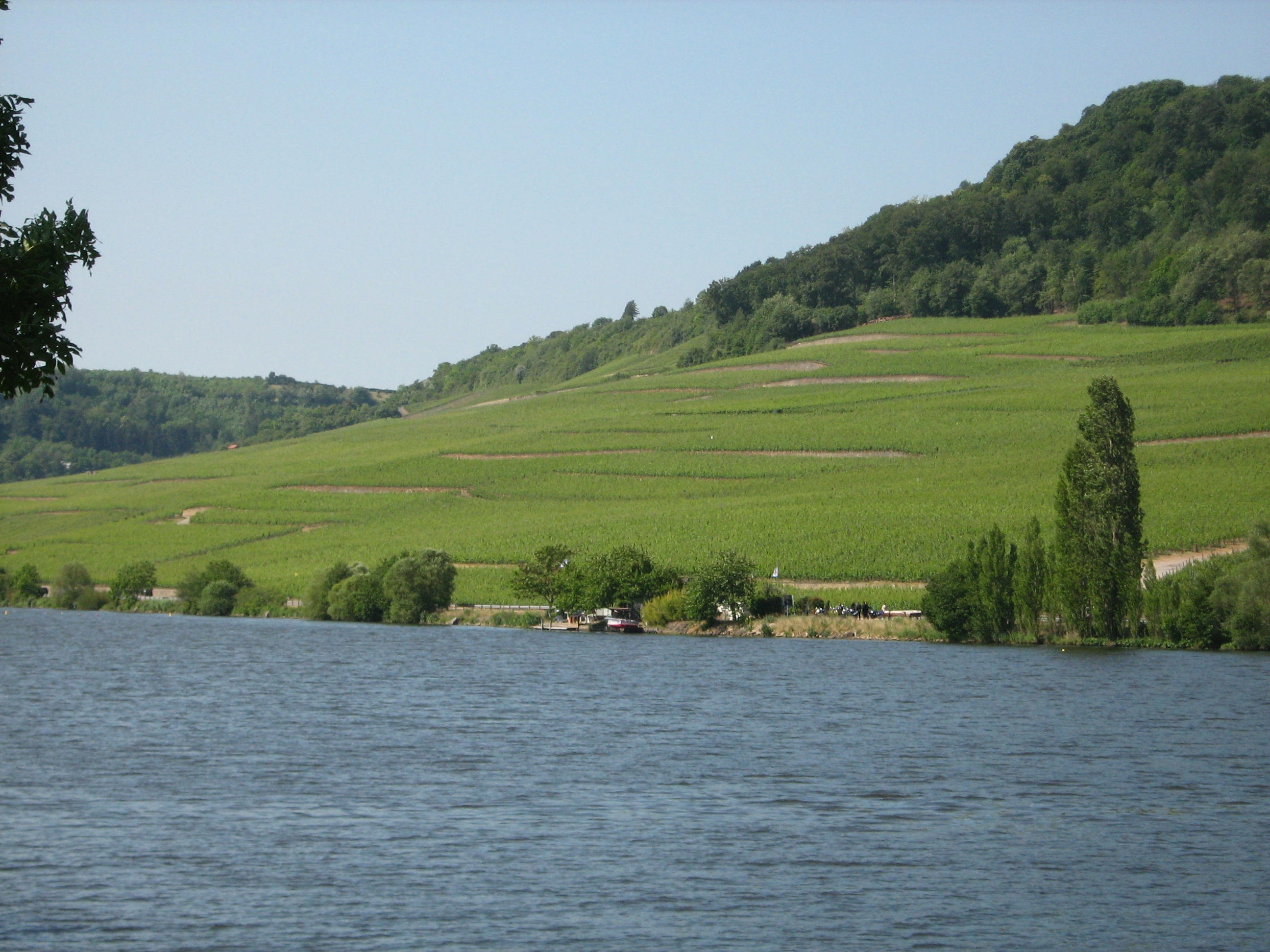
Vineyards along the Moselle Valley near Machtum, Luxembourg

The Moselle Valley (Note: French: vallée de la Moselle, pronounced [vale də la mɔzɛl]; German: Moseltal, pronounced [ˈmoːzl̩ˌtaːl]; Luxembourgish: Museldall) is a region in north-eastern France, south-western Germany, and eastern Luxembourg, centred on the river valley formed by the river Moselle. The Moselle runs through, and along the borders of, the three countries, and drains a fourth, Belgium.

The Moselle has been promoted as a quality white wine-producing region since the nineteenth century and "Moselle wine" is produced in three countries; it is the heart of the Luxembourg wine industry, and is also of the German Mosel region, and there are some vineyards in France. The Moselle has developed a strong tourism industry around its reputation as a rural idyll. The tourism sector is most prominent in the Luxembourgish and German parts of the Moselle.

Luxembourg's part of the valley roughly corresponds with the central and eastern parts of the cantons of Grevenmacher and Remich. Almost all of the lowest-lying communes in Luxembourg lie along the Moselle. There are no large towns in Luxembourg's part of the Moselle valley, but the main settlements are Grevenmacher, Mondorf-les-Bains, Remich, and Wasserbillig, all of which have populations in excess of 2,000 people.

== See also ==
- Metz
- Mont Saint-Quentin in Moselle Valley
