= Schlossberg (Brandenburg) =

Hill in Brandenburg, Germany

Coordinates: 51°50′45″N 14°09′26″E

Schlossberg (Burg)

Geography
- Location: Brandenburg, Germany

Schlossberg (German pronunciation: [ˈʃlɔsbɛʁk]) is a hill in Brandenburg, Germany.
