= Gerichtsassessor =

Candidate eligible for judicial appointment in German law

In the German legal system, a Gerichtsassessor (plural Gerichtsassessoren) was a candidate who had successfully passed the examination before the central board, and who was therefore eligible for the position of a judge or prosecutor (though most were not appointed as a judge or prosecutor). They are sometimes described as assistant judges. The obsolete designation Gerichtsassessor was held by judges or federal prosecutors, whose employment status today would be "on probation". Attainment of the second state legal qualification (the so-called "Competence to the Justiceship") was always a pre-requisite. The appointment took place with the intention that the Gerichtsassessor would be employed later in his lifetime as a judge.

The Gerichtsassessor usually held this designation for one year after receiving his Certificate of Appointment, before being appointed as a judge.

The number of Gerichtsassessoren was 3,855 in 1933, and 5,696 in 1935.

== See also ==
- Jurist
