= Plappeville =

- Commune
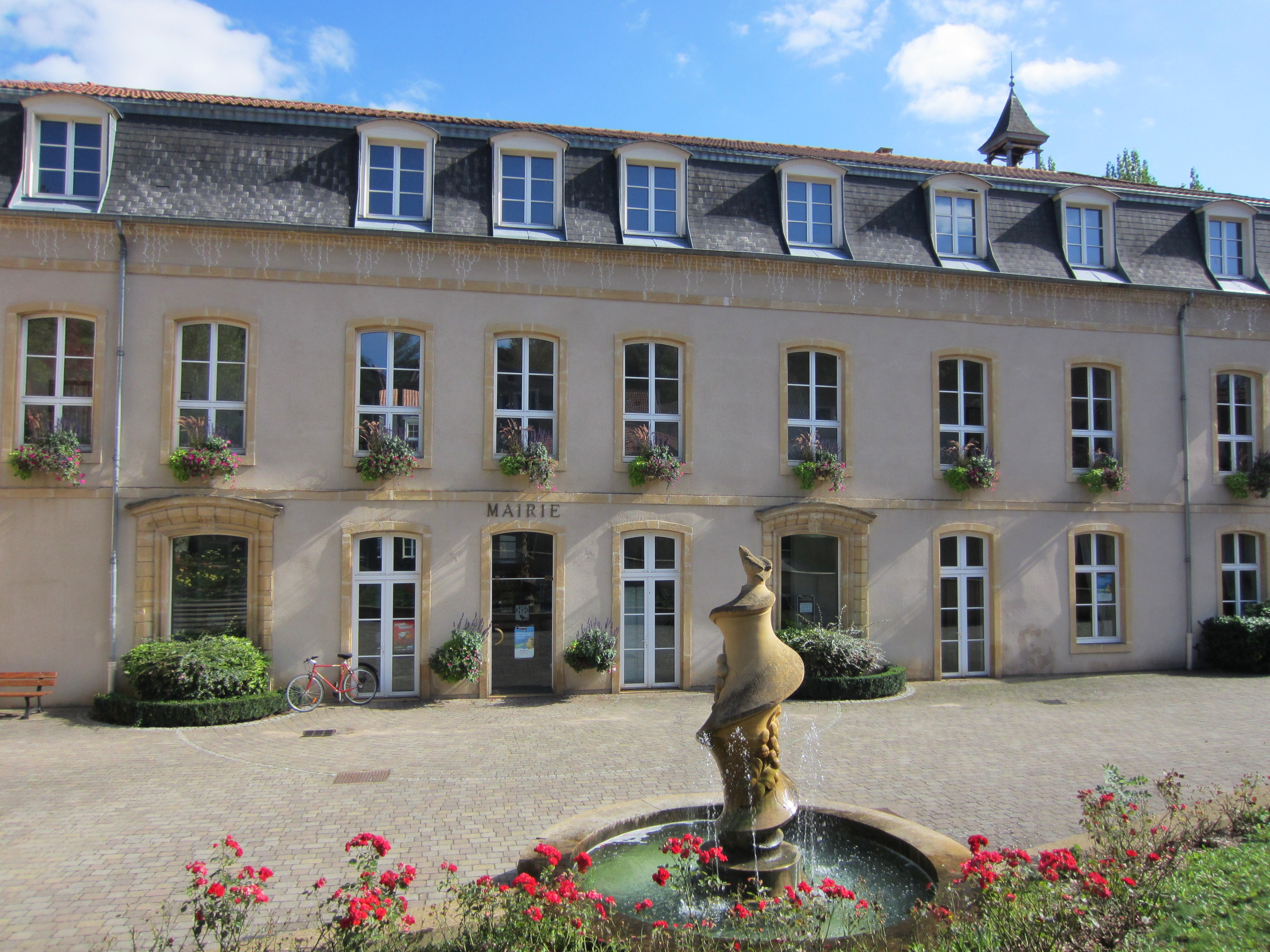
- The town hall in Plappeville

- Coat of arms
- Location of Plappeville
- Location within France Location within Grand Est
- Coordinates: 49°07′53″N 6°07′25″E
- Country: France
- Region: Grand Est
- Department: Moselle
- Arrondissement: Metz
- Canton: Montigny-lès-Metz
- Intercommunality: Metz Métropole

Government
  - Mayor (2020–2026): Daniel Defaux
- Area^{1}: 2.54 km^{2} (0.98 sq mi)
- Elevation: 300 m (980 ft)
- Highest elevation: 350 m (1,150 ft)
- Lowest elevation: 186 m (610 ft)
- Population (2023): 2,027
  - Density: 798/km^{2} (2,070/sq mi)
- Time zone: UTC+01:00 (CET)
  - Summer (DST): UTC+02:00 (CEST)
- INSEE/Postal code: 57545 /57050
- ^{1} French Land Register data, which excludes lakes, ponds, glaciers > 1 km^{2} (0.386 sq mi or 247 acres) and river estuaries.

Plappeville (French pronunciation: [plapvil]; German: Papolsheim) is a commune in the Moselle department in Grand Est in north-eastern France.

== Population ==
Historical population
Year	Pop.	±% p.a.
1968	1,615	—
1975	1,568	−0.42%
1982	1,776	+1.80%
1990	2,130	+2.30%
1999	2,341	+1.06%
2007	2,277	−0.35%
2012	2,085	−1.75%
2017	1,998	−0.85%
2023	2,027	+0.24%
Source: INSEE

== See also ==
- Communes of the Moselle department
- Fort de Plappeville
