= Wilhelm Kreis =

German architect

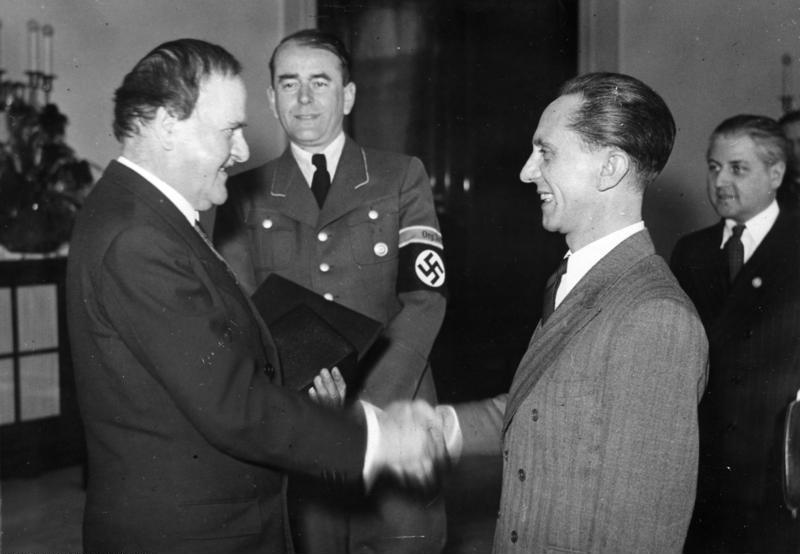
Wilhelm Kreis (left) honoured by Joseph Goebbels, 1943

Wilhelm Kreis (17 March 1873 – 13 August 1955) was a prominent German architect and professor of architecture, active through four political systems in German history: the Wilhelmine era, the Weimar Republic, the Third Reich, and the foundation of the Federal Republic.

Kreis was born in Eltville am Rhein in Hesse-Nassau. He first came to prominence with his 1896 submission for the Völkerschlachtdenkmal in Leipzig, although the commission went to Bruno Schmitz. Around the turn of the century, Kreis designed 58 of the Bismarck Towers, a number of civic projects in Dresden, the 1924 William Marx house, and other significant projects. The 1926 Rheinhalle (today:Tonhalle Düsseldorf) in Düsseldorf was his first major cultural project, followed by the German Hygiene Museum in Dresden. As opposed to the modernist movement then emerging, Kreis was among those architects like Heinrich Tessenow and Paul Bonatz who continued to work in a historical, conservative style.

Kreis was dismissed from the presidency of the League of German Architects (BDA) in 1933 and he saw his commissions dry up as a result. But within two years he was again working, under the direction of Albert Speer, for war projects in Dresden and the gigantic plans for Berlin, notably the design for the massive Soldiers Hall. Employing the respected Kreis brought Speer some legitimacy; Kreis responded by becoming an active supporter of National Socialism. He was named as one of the Reich's most important artists in the Gottbegnadeten list of September 1944.

In the postwar period, Kreis continued to receive commissions despite his advanced age.

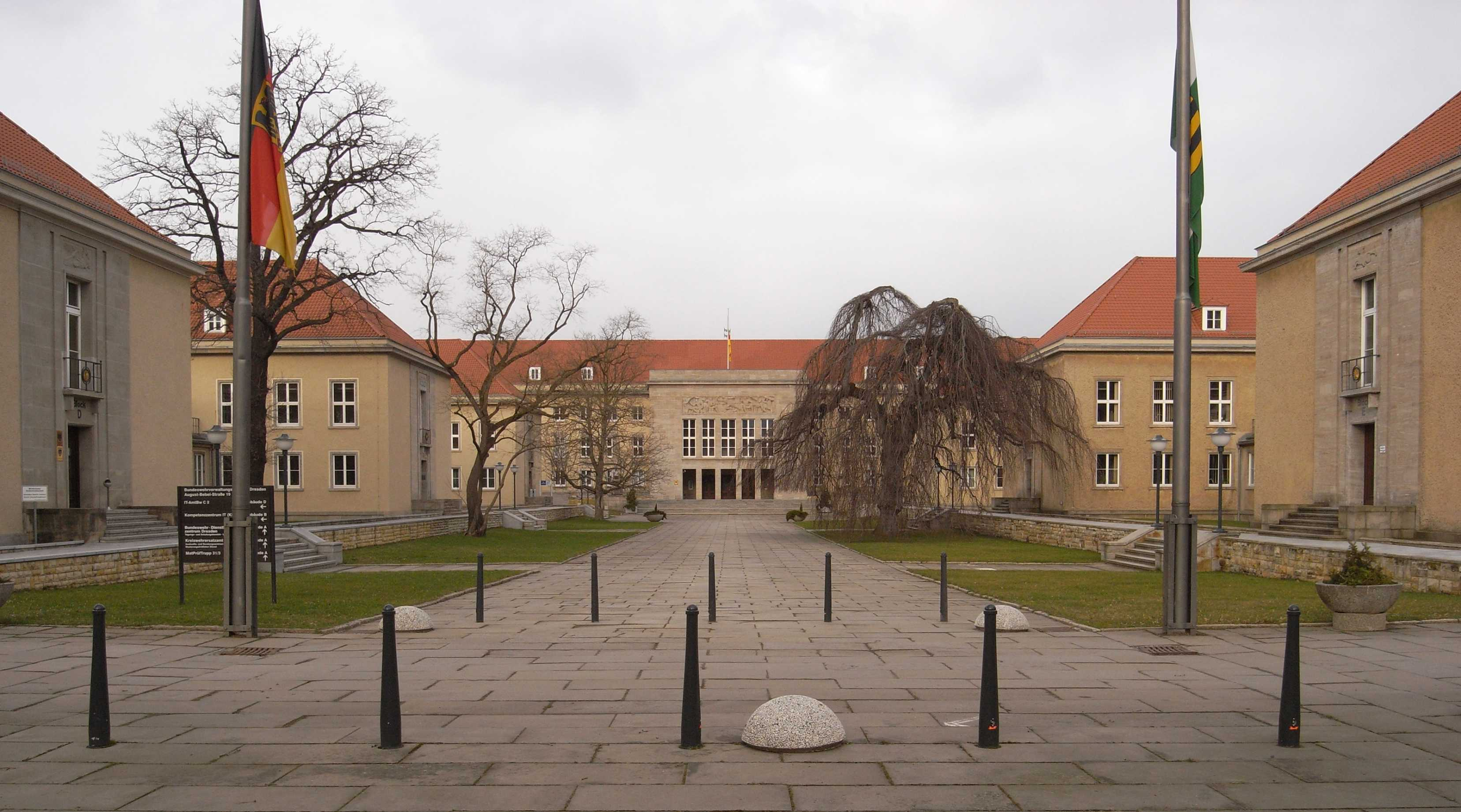
Luftwaffe-Luftgaukommando IV in Dresden, 1935–1938

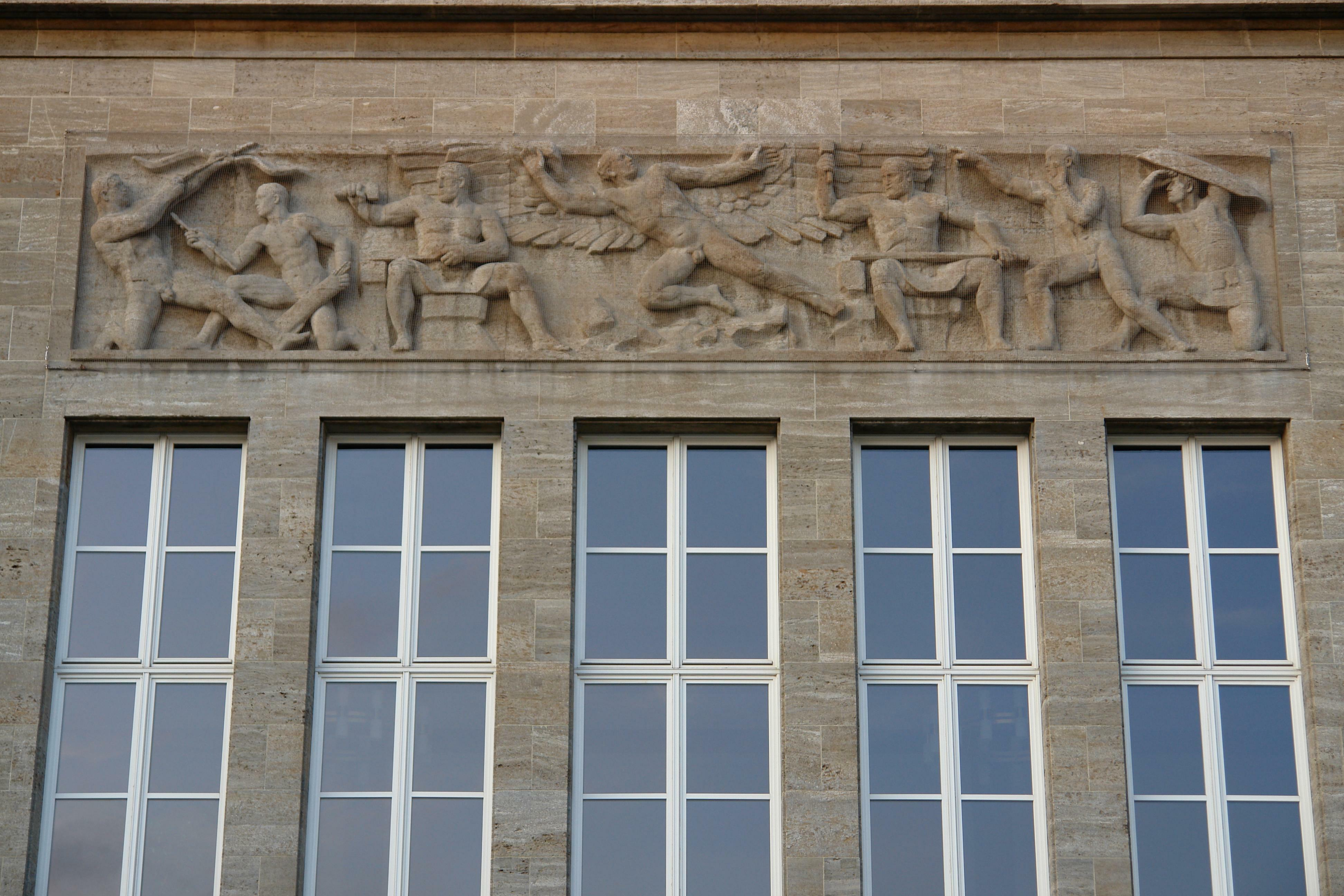
Detail: Relief with Icarus, Vulcan and warriors, 1937

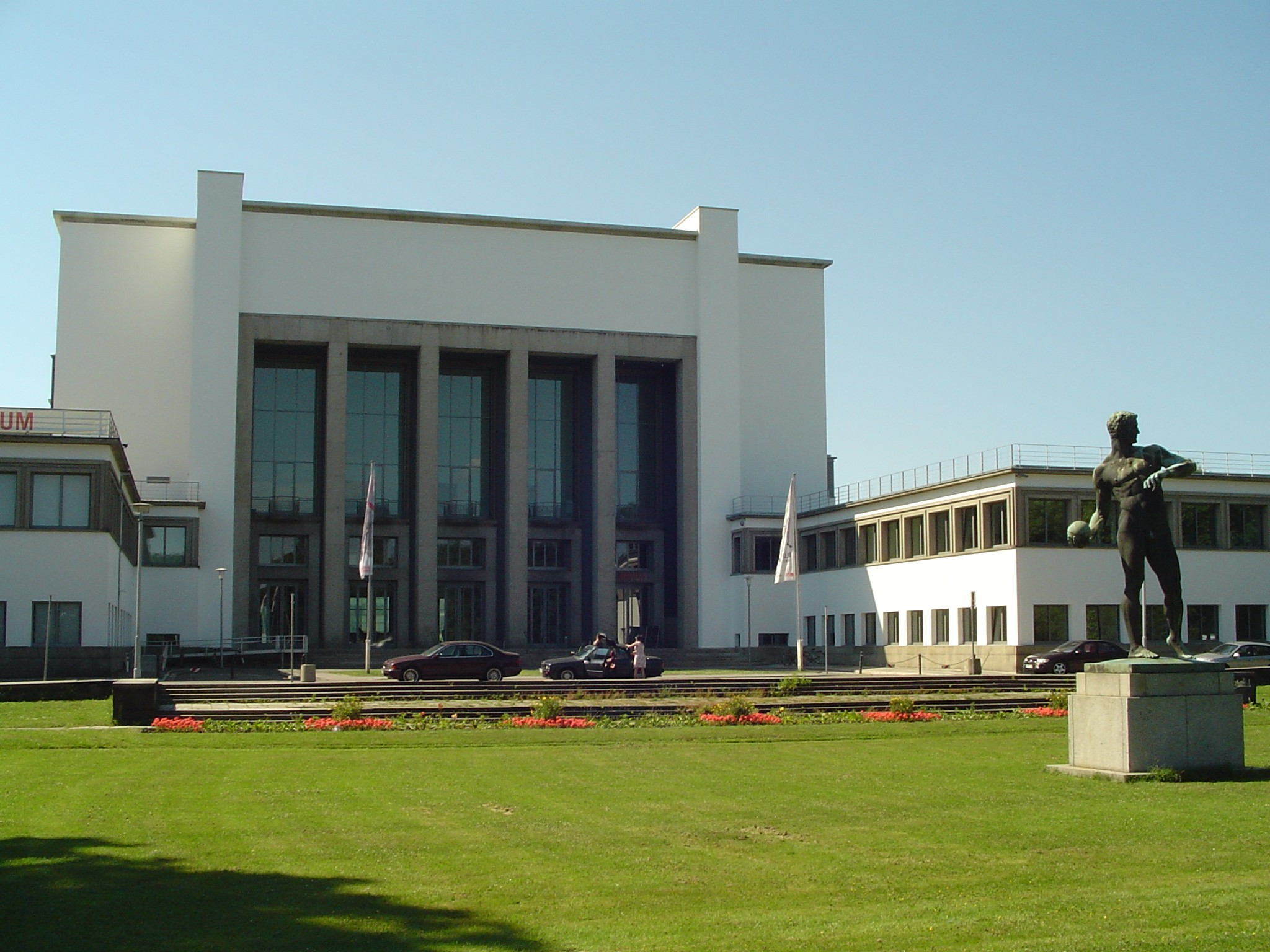
German Hygiene Museum in Dresden, 1930

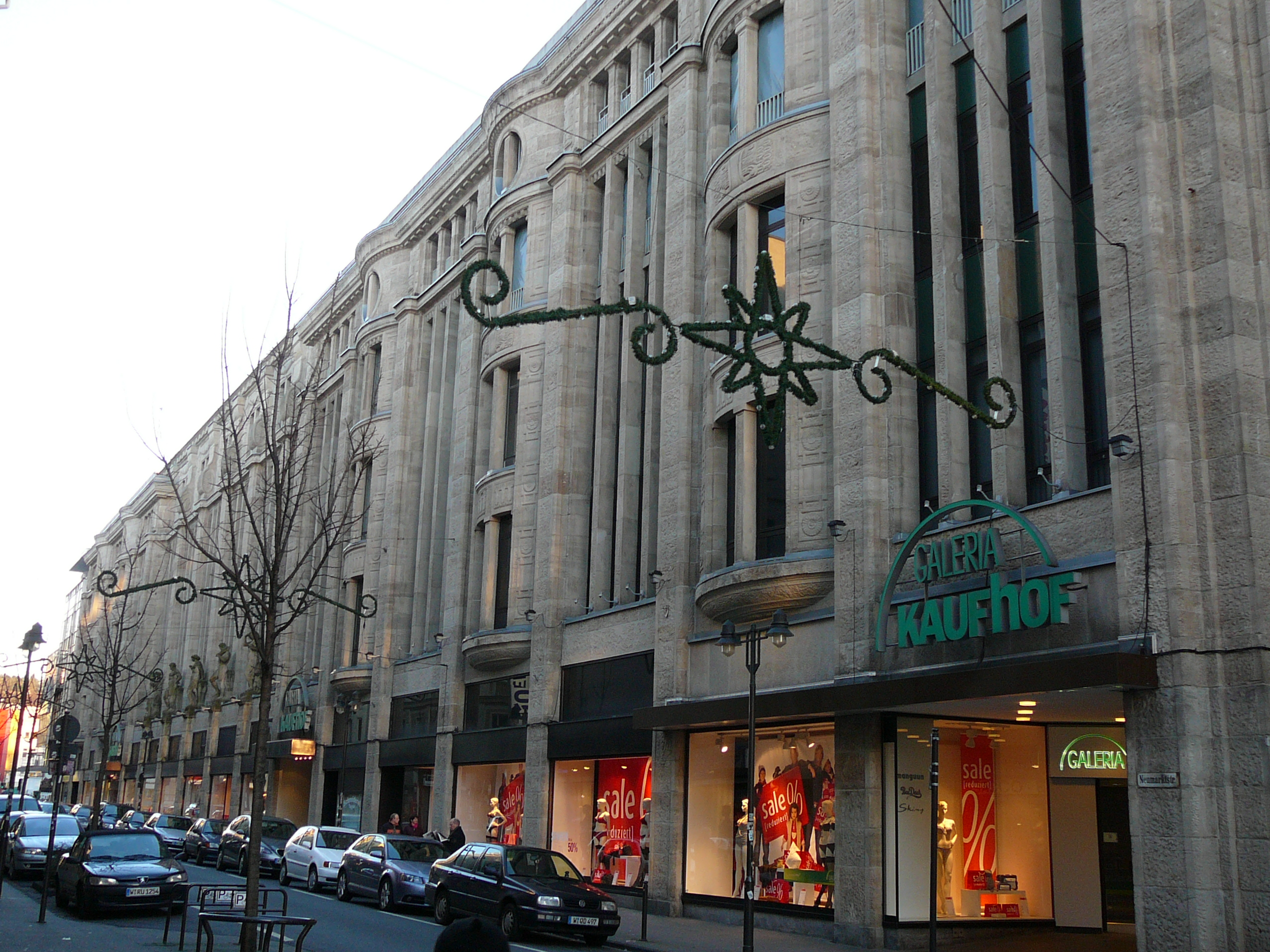
Kaufhaus Tietz in Wuppertal, 1911–1912

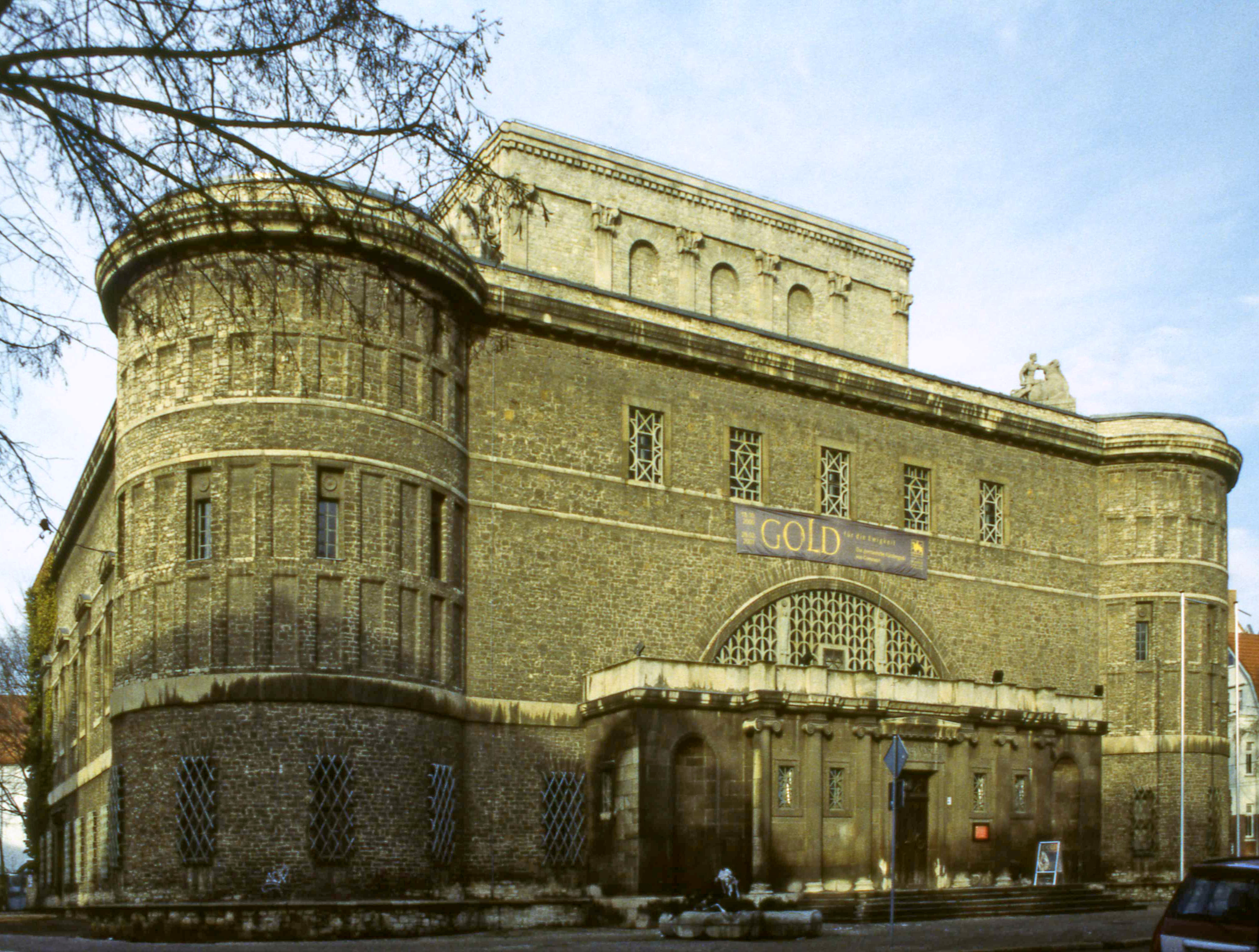
State Museum of Prehistory in Halle (Saale), 1911–1913

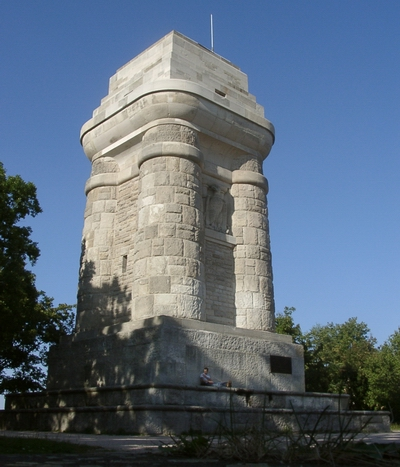
The 1904 Bismarck Tower in Stuttgart

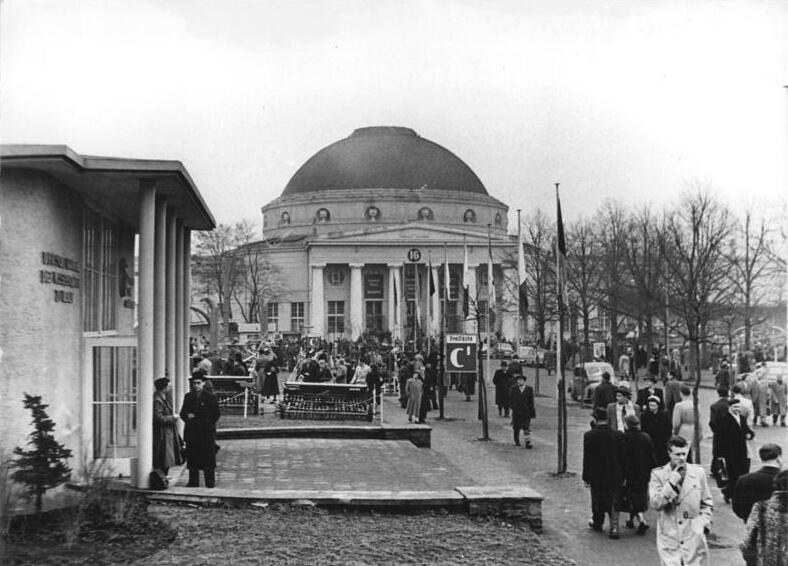
Exhibition hall 16 at Alte Messe in Leipzig (1913)
