= Le Ban-Saint-Martin =

- Commune
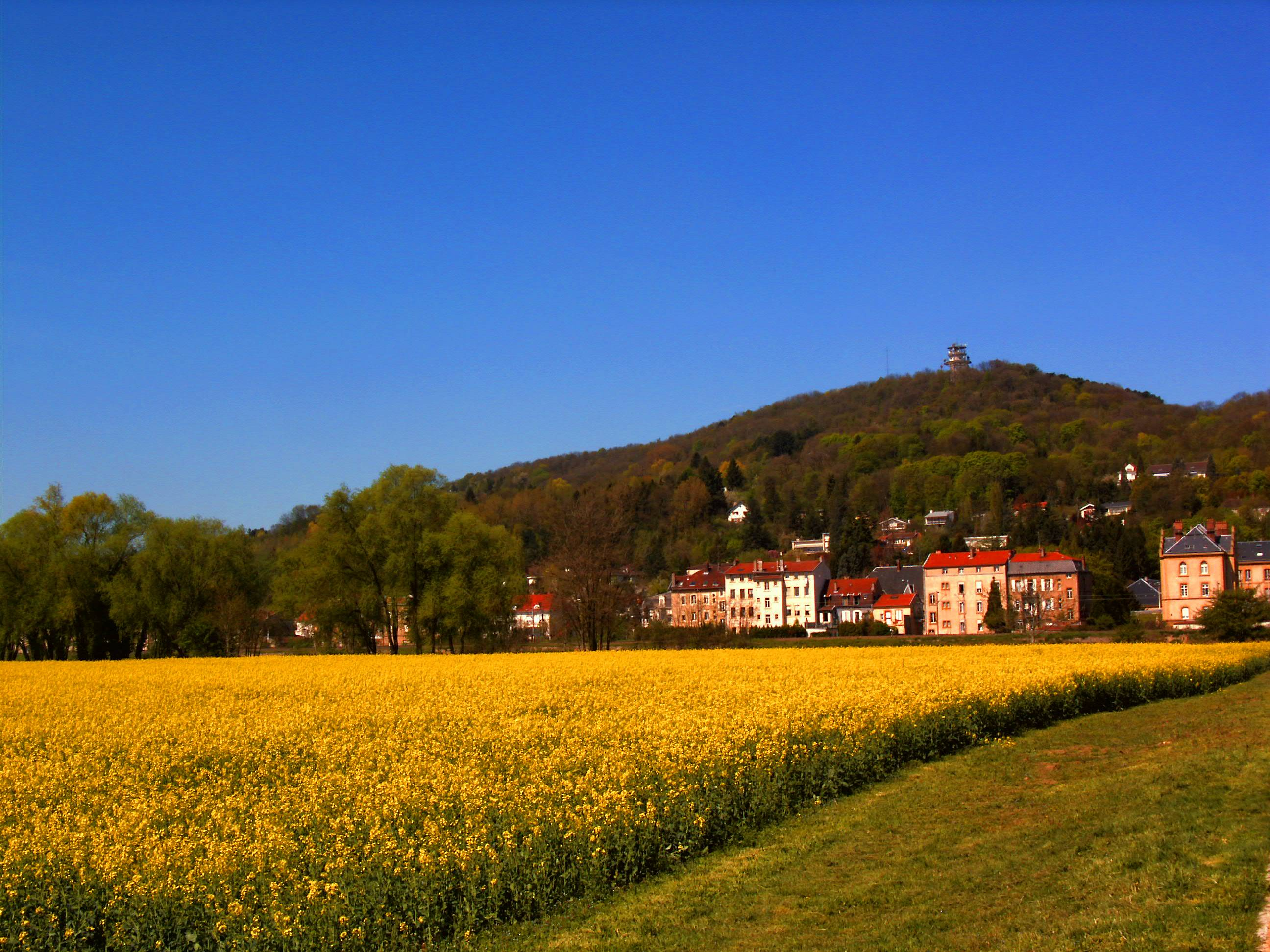
- A general view of Le Ban-Saint-Martin

- Coat of arms
- Location of Le Ban-Saint-Martin
- Location within France Location within Grand Est
- Coordinates: 49°07′21″N 6°09′04″E
- Country: France
- Region: Grand Est
- Department: Moselle
- Arrondissement: Metz
- Canton: Montigny-lès-Metz
- Intercommunality: Metz Métropole

Government
  - Mayor (2020–2026): Henri Hasser
- Area^{1}: 1.59 km^{2} (0.61 sq mi)
- Elevation: 310 m (1,020 ft)
- Highest elevation: 325 m (1,066 ft)
- Lowest elevation: 165 m (541 ft)
- Population (2023): 4,684
  - Density: 2,950/km^{2} (7,630/sq mi)
- Time zone: UTC+01:00 (CET)
  - Summer (DST): UTC+02:00 (CEST)
- INSEE/Postal code: 57049 /57050
- ^{1} French Land Register data, which excludes lakes, ponds, glaciers > 1 km^{2} (0.386 sq mi or 247 acres) and river estuaries.

Le Ban-Saint-Martin (French pronunciation: [lə bɑ̃ sɛ̃ maʁtɛ̃]; German: Sankt Martinsbann) is a commune in the Moselle department in Grand Est in northeastern France.

== Population ==
Historical population
Year	Pop.	±% p.a.
1968	3,624	—
1975	3,815	+0.74%
1982	3,733	−0.31%
1990	4,066	+1.07%
1999	4,293	+0.61%
2007	4,435	+0.41%
2012	4,230	−0.94%
2017	4,341	+0.52%
2023	4,684	+1.28%
Source: INSEE

== See also ==
- Communes of the Moselle department
