= Group Fortification Lorraine =

French military fort

Group Fortification Lorraine/Feste Lothringen

Site information
- Type: fort of type von Biehler

Location
- Location within France
- Coordinates: 49.101708°N 6.053228°E

Site history
- Built: 1899–1903

Garrison information
- Garrison: 1400 men

The Feste Lothringen, renamed Group Fortification Lorraine after 1919, is a military installation near Metz. It is part of the second fortified belt of forts of Metz and had its baptism of fire in late 1944, when the Battle of Metz occurred.

== Historical context ==
During the annexation, Metz was a German garrison of between 15,000 and 20,000 men at the beginning of the period and exceeded 25,000 men just before the First World War, gradually becoming the first stronghold of the German Reich. The Feste Lothringen completed the Second fortified belt of Metz composed of Festen Wagner (1904–1912), Crown Prince (1899–1905), Leipzig (1907–1912), empress (1899–1905), Lorraine (1899–1905), Freiherr von der Goltz (1907–1916), Haeseler (1899–1905), Prince Regent Luitpold (1907–1914) and Infantry-Werk Belle-Croix (1908–1914).

Built in the early 20th century, the group fortification became part of a wider program of fortifications called "Moselstellung", encompassing fortresses scattered between Thionville and Metz in the Moselle valley. The aim of Germany was to protect against a French attack to take back Alsace-Lorraine from the German Empire. The fortification system was designed to accommodate the growing advances in artillery since the end of 19th century. Based on new defensive concepts, such as dispersal and concealment, the fortified group was to be, in case of attack, an impassable barrier for French forces.

== Overall design ==
The scope of protection of the Group Fortification Lorraine was provided by a set of infantry positions, fortified barracks and artillery batteries scattered over a wide area and concealed by the natural topography. From 1899, the Schlieffen plan of the German General Staff designed the fortifications of the Moselstellung, between Metz and Thionville, to function like a lock for blocking any advance of French troops in case of conflict. This concept of a fortified line on the Moselle was a significant innovation compared to Système Séré de Rivières developed by the French. It later inspired the engineers of the Maginot Line.

== Construction and facilities ==
Group Fortification Lorraine was built on the heights of Saulny. It was to strengthen the northwest edge of the first fortified belt. It controlled the railway axis Metz-Verdun, through Amanvillers and the highway Metz-Briey. Covering an area of 385 ha, the Feste Lorraine was built from 1899 to 1903. It consists of a main fortification and two support points north and west. It has 6 howitzers 150 mm wide and six long guns 100 mm wide. It had 14 observation domes and 24 lookout posts. It had two concrete barracks, one for 1,000 men, the other for 400 men. It was designed to accommodate four infantry companies, in addition to the gunners. The Feste had a phone line and a power plant with 4 diesel engines of 35 hp. and 600 m of tunnels connecting the different positions.

== Successive assignments ==
In 1890 the garrison relief was guaranteed by the fort troops Corps XVI stationed at Metz and Thionville. At the back of the German lines during World War I, the fort did not have the test of fire. In November 1918, the fort was again occupied by the French army. After the departure of French troops in June 1940, the German army reinvested the fort. After the war, the French army resumed the fortified group. The main building was used until 1985 by GRET 806, then the 1st Company 43rd signals regiment. The main building is from the early 2000s decade, used as a support station for electric and two communication antennas of the army. This building is protected by three walls with barbed wire, fence and wrought iron gates. The third stronghold, the most in the center, was recently installed to prohibit access to communications antennas. The building is equipped with an alarm to prevent intrusion. All other blocks are accessible without having to cross the center stronghold.

== Second World War ==
In early September 1944, the Battle of Metz began. The German command integrated the defensive system set up around Metz. On September 2, 1944, Metz was declared, in effect by the Reich, fortress Hitler. The fortress was required to be defended to the last by German troops, whose leaders were all sworn to the Führer. The next day, September 3, 1944, General Krause, then commander of the fortress of Metz, established his High Command, the main command post in the barracks fort Alvensleben. The same day, the troops of General Krause took position on a line from Pagny-sur-Moselle to Mondelange, passing to the west of Metz by Chambley, Mars-la-Tour, Jarny and Briey. After an initial withdrawal, made on September 6, 1944, on Saint-privat and Amanvillers, the German lines were based firmly on the forts of the sector, particularly in the Group Fortification Lorraine, or Feste Lorraine, and the fortified positions on the sides of Amanvillers: Steinbruch-Stellung, Kellermann, and Wolfsberg-Stellung, Richepance and Batterie Vemont and Canrobert, and Horimont-Steelung. The area of Amanvillers–Saint-Privat was bound to the north by 1010th Sicherungs-Regiment of the Colonel Richter of the 462th Infanterie-Division and to the south by the Fahnenjunker of the Fahnenjunkerschule VI des Heeres, "Metz" under the command of Wehrmacht Colonel Siegroth. The sector fortifications, from Gravelotte to Semécourt, consisting of a discontinuous concrete wall, three meters high and 10 meters wide, reinforced by four forts, covered on the west by a line of outposts, trenches, barbed wire and machine gun positions, look stunning.

On the morning of September 9, 1944, the American artillery rained shells on identified German positions, paving the way for the infantry and the tanks of Task force McConnell. Arriving in the Wood Jaumont US troops' 2nd Infantry regiment were taken under fire by Fort Kellermann. The German batteries eliminated, within moments, seven tanks and two freestanding guns, forcing the column to withdraw precipitately. Wanting to bypass the fortifications from the north, the Americans were soon under fire from a German counterattack before being stopped by gunfire from Group Fortification Lorraine. The artillery of the US campaign immediately resumed his attacks on the fortifications of the sector, but without great results considering the terrain and vegetation. The 3rd Battalion of the Task force, in charge of the right flank of the attack, fell on the fortified farmhouse of Moscou, (Note: At that same place, the French troops of Napoleon III repelled the assault of three German columns, August 18, 1870, at the Battle of Gravelotte.) a veritable redoubt between the German fortifications, before being taken under heavy fire from Gravelotte. The 2nd Battalion Task force, which was heading towards Vernéville with relative ease, was finally stopped by gunfire from a sunken road, west of Fort Francis de Guise. The day ended with a failure for Colonel Roffe, who regretted high losses (Note: Losses of 2nd Infantry regiment already amounting to 14 officers and 332 men, including 228 in just the sector of Amanvillers.) for "twenty odd forts".

The Colonel of the Roffe 2nd Infantry regiment, whose losses already amounted to 14 officers and 332 men on the morning of September 9, required the air support of General Silvester. On September 10, 1944, three squadrons of fighter-bombers dropped their bombs on the eastern sector of Amanvillers, where the fortifications were grouped. The P-47s reached their targets, but the 500-pound bombs had little effect on the reinforced concrete fortifications. The infantry attack at 6:00 pm met fierce resistance. Despite the support of tanks, it stopped breathless three hours later. Towards Gravelotte, in the Woods Génivaux, American troops destroyed the Fahnenjunker of Wehrmacht (army) Colonel Siegroth that dominate the field. On the September 10, 1944, the commander of the 7th Armored Division agreed to take position near Roncourt to support a new attack from the 2nd Infantry regiment. The September 11, 1944, at 6:30 am, the tanks were headed for Pierrevillers, wiping the passage with sporadic gunfire. They finally came across a antitank roadblock, under fire from anti-tank guns camouflaged and difficult to locate. The infantry, however, managed to take a position on the wooded slopes, northwest of the village of Bronvaux, too far, however, to support the 2nd Infantry regiment. Despite several counter attacks by the 462th Infantry Division, American troops arrived to take over the land in the late afternoon, after a rolling artillery barrage targeting fortifications in the sector, and using smoke shells for cover.

On September 13, 1944, the US military redeployed its troops on the front line to concentrate its attack on the fortifications. But fatigue and stress disoriented the men of the 2nd Infantry regiment and they were finally relieved of such a Hell hole, (Note: "Received warning order that we are to be relieved which is good news, this is sure a hell hole" (Walking Journal of the 3rd Battalion 2nd Infantry Regimentof September 14, 1944).) September 14, 1944. The 1st Battalion Task force, hard hit by the shelling of the 462th Volks-Grenadier-Division and specific small arms fire, had to withdraw with difficulty behind a screen of smoke rockets, more than five hundred meters from Amanvillers. Around 14:00, an air strike on Amanvillers did not allow the infantry to advance, the village being too close to the fortifications of the sector to be taken in full. Two regiments, reinforced by the engineering companies 90th Infantry Division, took over in the area: the 357 Infantry Regiment of Colonel Barth took position along the woods of Jaumont, East of Saint-Privat, while 359 Infantry Regiment of Colonel Bacon took position east of Gravelotte.

On September 15, 1944, an attack was planned on the Canrobert sector of buildings and Kellermann sector to the north and Fort Jeanne d'Arc to the south of the sector. The approach was difficult, German soldiers defend inch by inch. American bazookas were not effective on the concrete bunkers, and tanks followed by armed flamethrower sections pouncing on the first German lines, neither reaching them, nor neutralizing them, nor taking them. General McLain sector concluded that a frontal attack would be doomed to failure and ordered his troops to keep the pressure on the outposts 462th Volks-Grenadier-Division without attacking frontally forts Jeanne-d'Arc and Lorraine.

On September 16, 1944, in thick fog, the attack on Canrobert started at 10:00. It was stopped two hours later by the Fahnenjunker of Colonel Siegroth, who engaged in a man-to-man fight without mercy. The Americans 357th Infantry Regiment withdrew, leaving 72 soldiers in the field. At 5:00 pm, the 1st Battalion of the same regiment was stopped in its tracks by artillery and small arms. In the southern sector, 2 Battalion lost 15 officers and 117 men under heavy fire from mortars and automatic weapons, from the buffer strip. At nightfall, the battalion has advanced only 200 meters.

Seeing that the Americans gradually ate away at their lines, the German artillery redoubled its fire, managing to contain the two regiments, and raising fears with General McLain of a new counterattack. Before the pugnacity of the elite troops of the 462th Volks-Grenadier-Division, General McLain, in agreement with the General Walker, decided to suspend the attacks, pending further plans of the General Staff of the 90th Infantry Division. While the troops of the Third US Army sat listening to Marlene Dietrich, German troops were taking advantage of the lull in fighting to reorganize. Reserve troops of the future 462th Volks-Grenadier-Division reinforced the elite fort troops of Wehrmacht Colonel Siegroth.

When hostilities resumed after a rainy month, the soldiers of the 462th Volks-Grenadier-Division still held firmly the forts of Metz, though supplies were more difficult under the artillery and the frequent bombings. As a prelude to the assault on Metz, November 9, 1944, the Air Force sent no less than 1,299 heavy bombers, B-17s and B-24s, to dump 3,753 tons of bombs, and 1,000 to 2,000 books on fortifications and strategic points in the combat zone of IIIrd army. Most bombers, having dropped bombs without visibility at over 20,000 feet, miss their military objectives. In Metz, the 689 loads of bombs dropped over the seven forts of Metz, identified as priority targets, merely caused collateral damage, proving once again the inadequacy of the massive bombing of military targets.

At dawn on November 14, 1944, the 105 mm howitzers from 359th Field Artillery Battalion opened fire on the area located on either side of the Fort Jeanne d'Arc, between the Fort Francis de Guise and the fort Driant to pave the way for 379th Infantry regiment, whose goal was to reach the Moselle. Further north, on November 15, 1944, the works of the Canrobert line in the wood of Fèves are attacked by the 378th Infantry Regiment of colonel Samuel L. Metcalfe. In the morning mist after an artillery preparation, the strong northern Canrobert line was the first to fall, at around 11:00 am, US troops arriving in the wood Woippy. During the afternoon, the men of 1217th Grenadier-Regiment « Richter », consisting of Security Regiment 1010 and those of 1515th Grenadier-Regiment « Stössel » of the 462th Volks-Grenadier-Division made several unsuccessful attempts to push the Americans behind the Canrobert line. Under pressure, they ended up dropping out, leaving behind them many casualties. German grenadiers, who had to withdraw to a line connecting strongpoint Leipzig to the Fort Plappeville, retreated in disorder towards Metz. On November 16, 1944, while the Americans progressed rapidly in Woippy, the Group Fortification Lorraine, considered a strong defensive position behind the Canrobert line, was evacuated without fighting by troops Kittel. The simultaneous attack of 377th and 378th Infantry Regiment had achieved its objectives.

Fort Jeanne d'Arc was the last of the forts of Metz to disarm. Determined German resistance, bad weather and floods, inopportunity, and a general tendency to underestimate the firepower of the fortifications of Metz, helped slow the US offensive, giving the opportunity to the German Army withdraw in good order to the Saar. The objective of the German staff, which was to stall US troops at Metz for the longest possible time before they could reach the front of the Siegfried Line, was largely achieved.

== See also ==
- Forts of Metz
- Fortifications of Metz
- Battle of Metz
