= Group Fortification Marne =

Feste Freiherr von der Goltz/Group Fortification Marne

Site information
- Type: fort of type von Biehler

Location
- Location within France
- Coordinates: 49.05154°N 6.152207°E

Site history
- Built: 1907–1916
- Fate: not used

Garrison information
- Garrison: 800 men

The Feste Mercy, renamed Feste Freiherr von der Goltz in 1911 and then The Group Fortification Marne in 1919, is a military installation near Metz, in the woods between Jury, Mercy and Ars-Laquenexy. It is part of the second fortified belt of forts of Metz and had its baptism of fire in late 1944, when the Battle of Metz occurred.

== Historical context ==
During The Annexation, Metz, would oscillate between a German garrison of 15,000 and 20,000 men at the beginning of the period and would exceed 25,000 men just before the First World War, gradually becoming the first stronghold of German Reich. The Feste Mercy completes the Second fortified belt of Metz composed of Festen Wagner (1904–1912), Crown Prince (1899–1905), Leipzig (1907–1912), empress (1899–1905), Lorraine (1899–1905), Baron von der Goltz (1907–1916), Haeseler (1899–1905), Prince Regent Luitpold (1907–1914) and Infantry-Werk Belle-Croix (1908–1914).

The Group Fortification, built in the early 20th century, was part of a wider program of fortifications called "Moselstellung", encompassing fortresses scattered between Thionville and Metz in the valley Moselle. The aim of Germany was to protect against a French attack to take back Alsace-Lorraine from the German Empire. The fortification system was designed to accommodate the growing advances in artillery since the end of the 19th century. Based on new defensive concepts, such as dispersal and concealment, the Group Fortification was to be, in case of attack, an impassable barrier for French forces.

== Overall design ==
At the perimeter of Group Fortification Marne protection is provided by a set of infantry positions, fortified barracks and artillery batteries scattered over a wide area and concealed by the natural topography. From 1899, the Schlieffen plan of the German General Staff designed the fortifications of the Moselstellung, between Metz and Thionville to be like a lock for blocking any advance of French troops in case of conflict. This concept of a fortified line on the Moselle was a significant innovation compared to système Séré de Rivière developed by the French. It later inspires the engineers of the Maginot Line.

== Construction and facilities ==
Covering an area of 205 ha, the Feste Freiherr von der Goltz was built from 1907 to 1916, in the woods between Jury, Mercy and Ars-Laquenexy. The fortified group has three fortified barracks which can accommodate a total of 800 men. It has 8 pieces of artillery, 6 100mm and 2 77mm guns. It has thirteen observation domes and twenty lookouts. The various items are connected by 2,000m of underground galleries. In its water tanks, it has 860m of water. The energy required for its operation is provided by four diesel engines of 22 hp each.

== Successive assignments ==
From 1890 the garrison relief is guaranteed by the fort troops Corps XVI stationed at Metz and Thionville. In November 1918, the fort was again occupied by the French army. After the departure of French troops in June 1940, the German army reinvests the fortifications.

== Second World War ==
In late August 1944, at the beginning of the Battle of Metz, the German command integrates the defensive system implemented around Metz. On September 2, 1944, Metz was declared fortress Reich by Hitler. The fortress must be defended to the last by German troops, whose leaders were all sworn to the Führer. The next day, September 3, 1944, General Krause, then commander of the fortress of Metz establishes its High Command, the main command post is in the barracks of fort Alvensleben. Fort Plappeville was indeed located west of the defenses of Metz, yet close to the center of Metz. The same day, the troops of General Krause took position on a line from Pagny-sur-Moselle to Mondelange, passing to the west of Metz by Chambley, Mars-la-Tour, Jarny and Briey. After an initial withdrawal, on 6 September 1944, the German lines now rely solidly on the western sector of the forts of Metz, especially on fortifications Lorraine, Jeanne D'Arc and Driant.

The US offensive launched September 7, 1944, is cut short. US troops stop at the Moselle, despite gaining two bridgeheads south of Metz. The fortifications being better defended than they had thought, US troops are now out of breath. General McLain, in agreement with the General Walker, decided to suspend the attacks, pending further plans of the General Staff of the 90th Infantry Division. While the troops of the Third US Army sit listening to Marlene Dietrich, German troops are taking advantage of the lull in fighting to reorganize. Reserve troops of the future 462th Volks-Grenadier-Division fill in, into the fortifications, with the elite troops of Colonel Siegroth. (Note: For his commitment during the Battle of Metz, SS Colonel Siegroth obtained the Knight's Cross of the Iron Cross, October 18, 1944.) When hostilities resume after a rainy month, the soldiers of the 462th Volks-Grenadier-Division still hold firmly the forts of Metz, though supplies are more difficult under the artillery and the frequent bombings.

On November 9, 1944, the Air Force sends no less than 1,299 heavy bombers, B-17s and B-24s, to drop 3,753 tons of bombs, and 1,000 to 2,000 books on the fortifications and strategic points in the combat zone of IIIrd army. Most bombers, having dropped bombs without visibility at over 20 000 feet, miss their military objectives. In Metz, the 689 loads of bombs destined to strike the fort Jeanne d’Arc and six other forts, identified as priority targets, merely cause collateral damage, proving once again the inadequacy of the massive bombing of military targets.

Mid-November 1944, the XIIth and XXth US Army corps are trying to take the fortifications of Metz in a pincer movement. 95th Infantry Division must focus its efforts on the western front of Metz, while 5th division must outflank the German lines north and south. The enveloping attack of the US Army finally succeeded after three days of uncertainty. On the evening of November 17, 1944, the situation of German defenders becomes critical. The able-bodied men of 462th Volks-Grenadier-Division are mostly surrounded in the forts of Metz. The remaining troops, fragmented to the extreme, hold key positions within the city. The city of Metz fell into the hands of Americans November 22, 1944, but some forts still stand, two weeks later.

On December 6, 1944, Group Fortification Saint-Quentin surrenders with its large garrison. The Fort Plappeville drops its arms the next day. The Group Fortification Jeanne-d'Arc, Old Feste Empress, probably because it was controlled by the staff of the 462th Volks-Grenadier-Division and defended by a battalion of fusiliers, is the last of the forts of Metz to surrender, December 13, 1944. Determined German resistance, bad weather and floods, inopportunity, and a general tendency to underestimate the firepower of the fortifications of Metz, have helped slow the US offensive, giving the opportunity to the German Army withdraw in good order to the Saar. The objective of the German staff, which was to stall US troops at Metz for the longest possible time before they could reach the front of the Siegfried Line, is largely achieved.

== See also ==
- Forts of Metz
- Fortifications of Metz
- Battle of Metz
