= Group Fortification Verdun =

Feste Graf Haeseler/Group Fortification Verdun

Site information
- Type: fort of type von Biehler

Location
- Location within France
- Coordinates: 49.0243°N 6.0558°E

Site history
- Built: 1899-1905
- Fate: not used

Garrison information
- Garrison: 700 men (500+200)

The Feste Haeseler, renamed Group Fortification Verdun after 1919, is a military installation near Metz. Constituted as forts Sommy and Saint-Blaise, the fortified group is part of the second fortified belt of forts of Metz. It had its baptism of fire in late 1944, when the Battle of Metz occurred.

== Historical context ==
During the German annexation, Metz, will oscillate between a German garrison of between 15,000 and 20,000 men at the beginning of period and will exceed 25,000 men just before the First World War, gradually becoming the first stronghold of German Reich. The Feste Haeseler complete the Second fort belt around Metz composed of Festen Wagner (1904-1912), Crown Prince (1899 - 1905), Leipzig (1907–1912), empress (1899-1905), Lorraine (1899-1905), Freiherr von der Goltz (1907-1916), Haeseler (1899-1905), Prince Regent Luitpold (1907-1914) and Infantry-Werk Belle-Croix (1908-1914).

Named in honor of Count Gottlieb von Haeseler, Commander XVIth Army Corps Metz, the Group Fortification was built on the right bank of the Moselle, south of Metz, between the villages of Corny-sur-Moselle and D'Augny. Complementary to the Feste Crown Prince, the Feste Haeseler controlled the Moselle valley, at the axis of the road and rail communication between Metz and Nancy. The fort was part of a wider program of fortifications called "Moselstellung" encompassing fortresses scattered between Thionville and Metz in the valley Moselle. The aim of Germany was to protect against a French attack to take back Alsace-Lorraine from the German Empire. The fortification system was designed to accommodate the growing advances in artillery since the end of XIX^{is} century. Based on new defensive concepts, such as dispersal and concealment, the fortified group was to be, in case of attack, an impassable barrier for French forces.

== Overall design ==
Protection of the perimeter of Verdun is provided by a set of infantry positions, fortified barracks and artillery batteries scattered over a wide area and concealed by the natural topography. From 1899, the Schlieffen plan of the German General Staff designed the fortifications of the Moselstellung, between Metz and Thionville to be like a lock for blocking any advance of French troops in case of conflict. This concept of a fortified line on the Moselle was a significant innovation compared to the système Séré de Rivières developed by the French. It later inspired the engineers of the Maginot Line.

== Construction and facilities ==
On May 9, 1899, Kaiser Wilhelm II laid the first stone of Fort St. Blaise. Group Fortification Verdun group is built on top of two hills, it consists of two forts, the fort Sommy 30 ha in the south, and Fort Saint-Blaise 45 ha on the north. Group Fortification Verdun has four 150mm howitzers and six short 100mm guns. Fort St. Blaise was planned for 500 men and fort Sommy for 200 men. It could then receive two infantry companies, in addition to the gunners. St. Blaise, whose fortified barracks could receive 500 people, has 10 observation domes and 12 lookout posts. The water tank's capacity was 1,300 m. 4 diesel engines of 25HP each, providing the energy necessary for Fort St. Blaise. The fort Sommy, including the fortified barracks, could accommodate 200 people, and has 6 observation domes and 8 lookouts. Its water tank could hold 600 m and it had 3 diesel engines of 20HP each, to provide the energy needed for its operation. The coat of arms of Count of Haeseler is carved on the pediment of the door of the fort.

== Successive assignments ==
During The Annexation of the Alsace-Lorraine, the fort receives a garrison of gunners belonging to the XVIth Army Corps. From 1914 to 1918, it served as a relay for the German soldiers at the front. Its equipment and weapons are then at the forefront of military technology. In 1919, the fort was occupied by the French army.

After the departure of French troops in June 1940, the German army reinvests the forts. In early September 1944, at the beginning of the Battle of Metz, the German command integrates the defensive system set up around Metz. Given the American "bridgehead" at Dornot, fierce fighting took place around the fort in September 1944. Currently, the fort is abandoned. The strong German has remarkable wall paintings prior to 1918.

== Second World War ==
During the Battle of Metz, the Group Fortifications of Verdun show all its military potential and its real defensive qualities. Underestimating the German forces in the sector and the firepower of forts of Metz, (Note: According to General Friedrich von Mellenthin Officer to the staff of Army Group G the battle of Metz " was a result of errors caused, in large part, by an overflowing optimism expressed by those who directed operations » (« Objectives achieved but ... », in Les années Liberté, Metz, 1994.) the US military tried to establish a bridgehead on the east bank of the Moselle, up to Dornot, to the south of Metz. Group Fortification Driant and Group Fortification Verdun dominate the Moselle valley there, and can cover with their guns the entire sector. In addition, the troops of the 462th Infanterie-Division and the Fahnenjunker of the officers school of Metz (Note: Fahnenjunkerschule VI des Heeres “Metz”: School of Metz officers, under the command of SS Colonel Joachim von Siegroth (1800 Flags Junkers).) know well the terrain. The fighting around the two fortified groups will take place from 7 September 1944 to 11 December 1944, under extreme conditions.

On September 8, 1944 3rd Battalion 11th Infantry Regiment of the US Army aims to take the Group Fortification Verdun, which is the forts St. Blaise and Sommy. The fort is only bound by an officer and six men of the Nachrichtenschule der Waffen-SS. (Note: School of transmissions of the Waffen-ss Metz, under the command of SS Colonel Ernst Kemper.) A rolling artillery barrage prepares the ground for US assault troops, who encountered little resistance. Under fire of artillery, the section of the 462 Infanterie-Division, which has the defense of the sector, withdraws, in effect, cautiously to the northward direction to Frescaty. After a final shootout (Note: Germans were finished by the GIs, in retaliation, when American officers was fatally wounded.) The company F of 11th Infantry Regiment reached the ditches of the fort, protected by insurmountable harrows. The Germans seem to have deserted the sector, where an eerie silence now falls flat. Not knowing what to expect, the American captain of the company F requests a preventative artillery shelling of the fort. But the first three rounds are fired too short, making several deaths and injuries among his own ranks, and the following salvos fall on a deserted fort.

Immediately after, mortars and machine guns of the 37th SS Panzer Grenadier Regiment of the famous 17th SS-Panzergrenadier division, just having arrived in the area, were unleashed on the western slope of the Group Fortification, hitting the rear of the two American companies. Sections of Assault 2nd US battalion must then fall back on the position of Horseshoe from Dornot under murderous cross fire. At 22:00, the 6th the company of the 37th SS Panzer Grenadier Regiment managed to regain possession of Fort St. Blaise, under a deluge of fire. When the morning comes, the losses are already heavy in both armies. On September 9, 1944, General Kraus reassigns no less than 1,000 soldiers of the 37th SS Panzer Grenadier Regiment, (Note: Questionable estimate from a German prisoner belonging to this unit during interrogation.) to the defense of the Group Fortification Verdun, facing the bridgehead of Dornot. On the September 10, 1944, to cover the American retreat on Dornot, P-47s, from 23rd Squadron 36th Bomber Group XIXth TAC , dropp no less than 23 225 kg bombs and 12 115 kg bombs on forts Sommy and Saint-Blaise which literally bury the German grenadiers. They destroy with a hit the turret of a 150mm gun, but the superstructure of the fort is relatively unscathed. Despite the incendiary bombs and deadly shelling of the US Army, German troops still firmly hold the position.

To secure the area and contain the German troops in the strongholds of the fortified line West of Metz von Gallwitz, a military operation is mounted in the following days by the US military. The operation Thunderbolt, coordinating a combined attack on the ground and in the air, is scheduled for Sept. 17, 1944. On September 26, bombers of the 19th Tactical Air Force conduct an air strike on the forts of Metz, dropping bombs of 500 kg napalm. The concrete and buried fortifications are resistant to this air attack. Before September 30, 1944, two new air raids will prove ineffective to dislodge the German soldiers who are holed up during the raids, and return to their battle stations immediately after.

For a long month, the besieged soldiers will remain in their posts, with discipline and resignation, pending a final US attack that will not come. The Americans, having drawn the consequences of their failure before the Group Fortification Driant have effectively renounced taking the forts west of Metz by frontal assault. General Patton, poorly digesting this failure, demanded each day for Bomber Command air raids on the forts, for " paving hell with those dirty bastards Germans ". The weather decided otherwise. The "revenge" operation finally was born, shortly before the fall of Metz. As a prelude to the offensive on the city, the Air Force sent, on November 9, 1944, no less than 1,299 heavy bombers, B-17s and B-24s, to drop 3,753 tons of bombs, and 1,000 to 2,000 books on fortifications and strategic points in the combat zone of IIIrd army. Most bombers, having dropped bombs without visibility at over 20,000 feet, miss their military targets. In Metz, the 689 loads of bombs dropped over the seven forts of Metz, designated as priority targets, did nothing but cause collateral damage, proving once again the inadequacy of the massive bombing of military targets.

After a rapid progression during the night of 16 to 17 November 1944, the 3rd Battalion 11th Infantry Regiment encircles the fortified group, forcing its defenders to hide in bunkers and underground. While city messine fell to the Allies, November 22, 1944, at 14:35, the connections between the forts and the Metz command post are permanently cut. The forts, surrounded by 9 000 GIs, no longer communicate with each other. Locked in their bunkers, soldiers of the 462th Volksgrenadier Division can only rely on themselves. Short of food and ammunition, old Feste Haeseler surrenders on November 26, 1944, in the morning. Two officers and 148 troops come out, physically nervous and exhausted. Once in place, US troops are eager to hoist their flag atop the fort, under the flashes of the military photographers, definitely wanting to forget the humiliating defeat of Dornot.

The fort Jeanne-d’Arc was the last of the forts of Metz to disarm, December 13, 1944. Determined German resistance, bad weather and floods, inopportunity, and a general tendency to underestimate the firepower of the fortifications of Metz, have helped slow the US offensive, giving the opportunity to the German Army withdraw in good order to the Saar. The objective of the German staff, which was to stall US troops at Metz for the longest possible time before they could reach the front of the Siegfried Line, is largely achieved.

== See as well ==
- Forts of Metz
- Fortifications of Metz
- Battle of Metz
