= Group Fortifications of Aisne =

Feste Wagner/Fortifications of Aisne
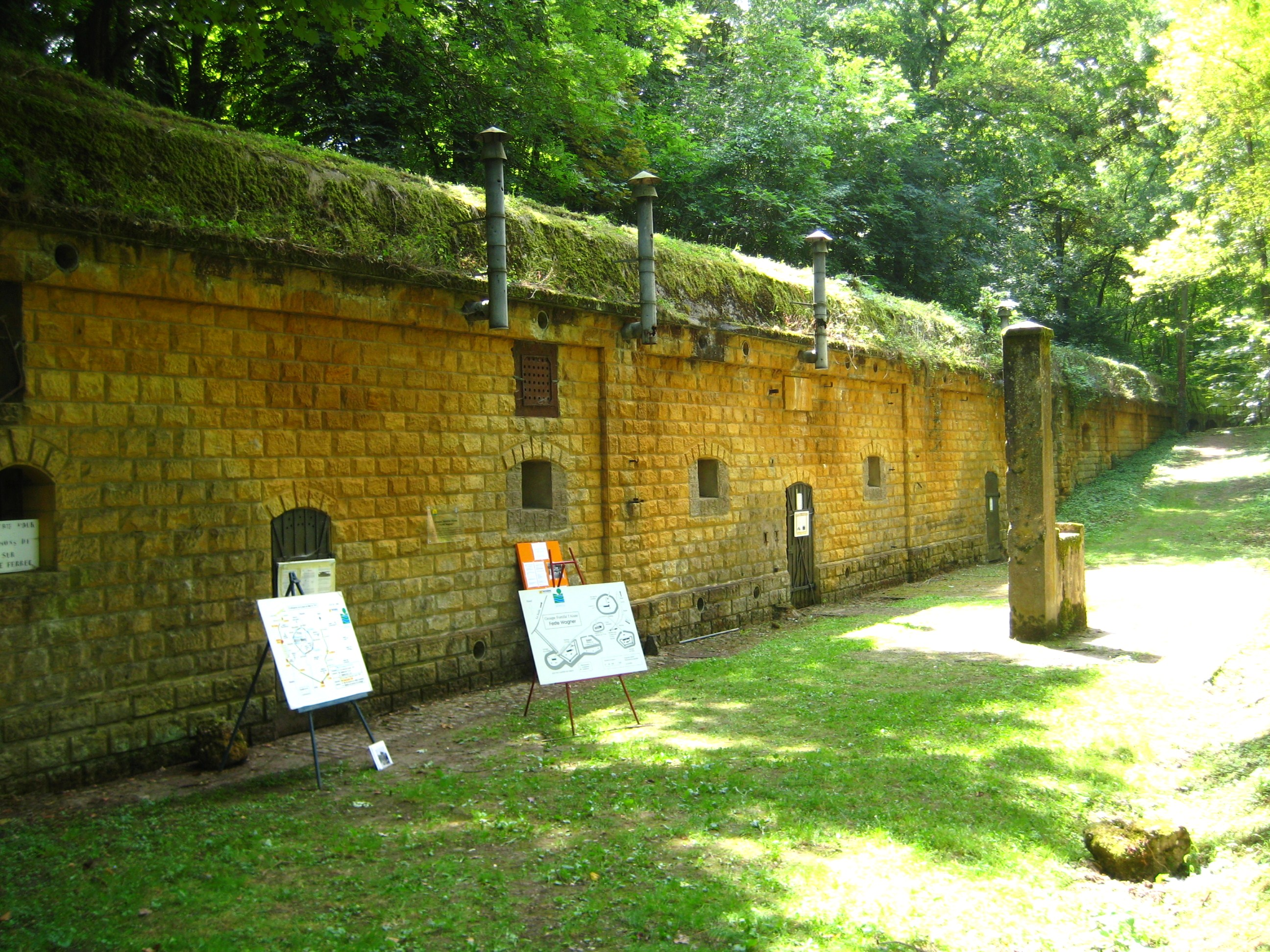
- Fort of l’Aisne and Verny

Site information
- Type: fort of type von Biehler

Location
- Location within France
- Coordinates: 49.0496°N 6.114°E

Site history
- Built: 1912
- Fate: unused

Garrison information
- Garrison: 1250 men

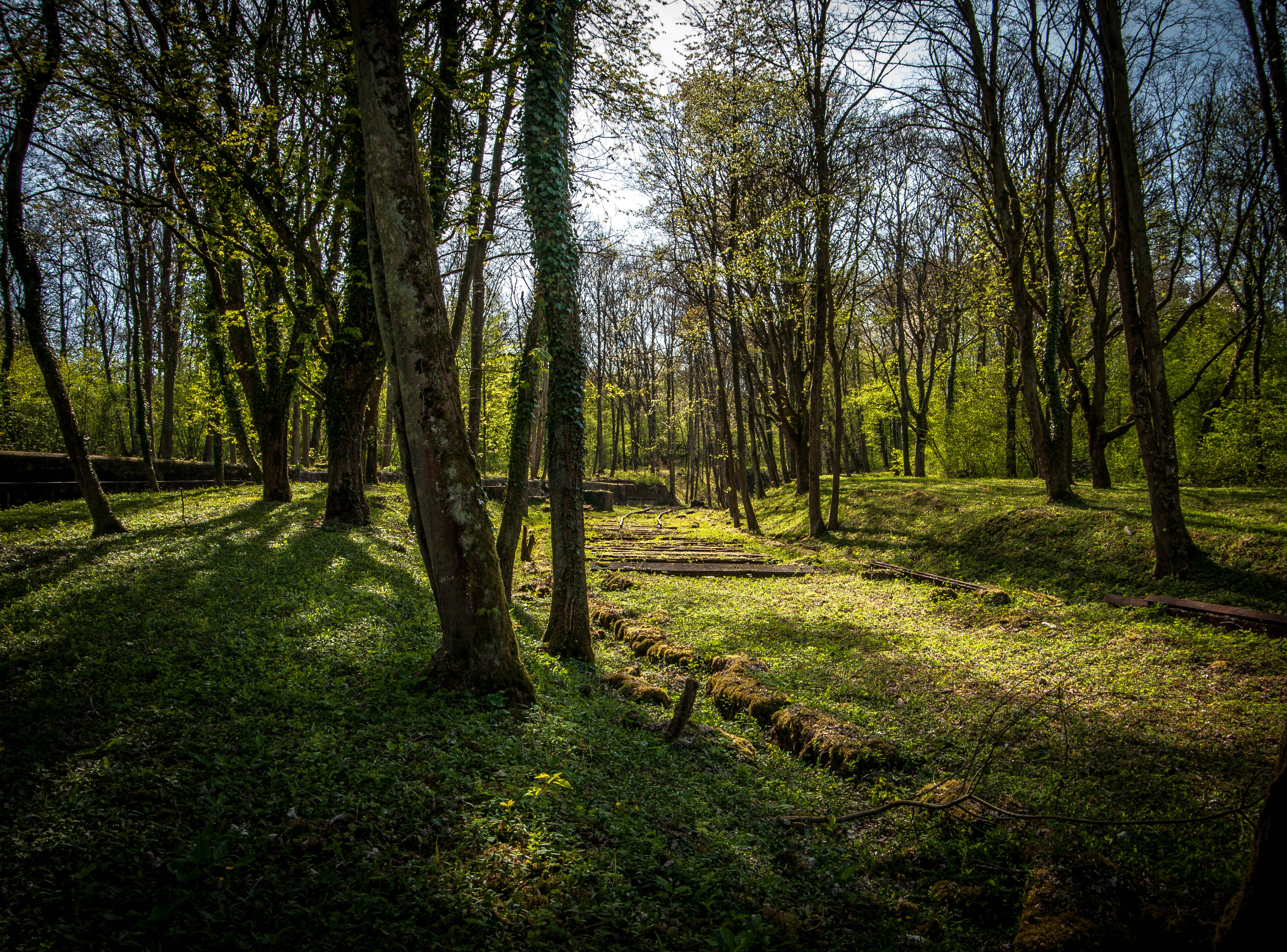
Old railings at Group Fortifications of Aisne.

The Feste Wagner, renamed Group Fortifications of Aisne by the French in 1919, is a fort of the second fortified belt of forts from Metz, in Moselle. This group fortification, built in the municipalities of Pournoy-la-Grasse and of Verny, controlled the valley of the Seille. It had its baptism of fire in late 1944, when the Battle of Metz occurred.

== Historical context ==
During The Annexation, Metz oscillated between a German garrison of 15,000 and 20,000 men at the beginning of the period and exceeded 25,000 men just before the First World War, gradually becoming the first stronghold of the German Reich. The Feste Wagner completed the Second fortified belt of Metz composed of Festen Wagner, Crown Prince (1899–1905), Leipzig (1907–1912), empress (1899–1905), Lorraine (1899–1905), Freiherr von der Goltz (1907–1916), Haeseler (1899–1905), Prince Regent Luitpold (1907–1914) and Infantry-Werk Belle-Croix (1908–1914). The fortress of Metz was part of a wider program of fortifications called the "Moselstellung" and encompassed fortresses scattered throughout the Moselle valley between Thionville and Metz. To this end, the two cities were specially served by the Kanonenbahn Berlin - Metz, a strategic railway line. The aim of Germany was to protect against a French attack trying to take Alsace-Lorraine from the German Empire. From 1899, the Schlieffen plan of the German General Staff designed the fortifications of the Moselstellung as like a lock for blocking any advance of French troops in case of conflict. This concept of a fortified line on the Moselle was a significant innovation compared to the Système Séré de Rivières developed by the French. It later inspired the engineers of the Maginot Line.

== Construction and facilities ==
The Group Fortifications of Aisne had to protect the Seille valley, not far from Verny. This mission was to be facilitated by a defensive flood, thus locking the entire southern front of Metz. Built between 1904 and 1910 the fortified structure was renamed Feste Wagner, in tribute to Julius Wagner, the German general responsible for the A.K.O. belonging to the forts of Metz.

The fort is part of the second-generation works. It was able to benefit from the latest innovations, both in the field of armaments, and also of living conditions. It offered great comfort for the time—central heating, toilets, a bread oven, an electric plant, a telephone and running water. Its firepower was matched only by its rugged durability, thanks to its new and massive use of concrete and steel. A network of tunnels provided connections between the various points of the fortified group, covering an area of over 40 ha. The artillery fort could fire up to two tons of ordnance per minute, thanks to its artillery pieces of 5.3 cm, 10 cm or 15 cm. The four fortified barracks could accommodate four Infanteriekompanien, two MG-Kompanien, two Artilleriebatterien, three Pioneer-sections for a total of 1,250 men. The fort had 15 observation cupolas and 51 lookout posts, and no less than 1,950m of tunnels connecting the various stations of the fort. The fortified group had reserves of 2,200 m^{3} of water. Finally, seven diesel engines, each 30 hp, provided the energy needed for its operation.

== Successive assignments ==
From 1890 the garrison relief was guaranteed by the Corps XVI, stationed at Metz and Thionville. During World War I, the fort only took a support role for the front, and did not see any combat. Its artillery was effective. Its rear base position enabled it to be decorated with superb frescoes, still visible today. In 1919, like all the forts of Metz, it surrendered to the French army. Its comfort and its technological prowess impressed the French General Staff, who drew valuable lessons from it for the construction of the future Maginot Line. Between the wars, the fort served as t was before being plundered in the 1970s. Since 1982, the Association pour la découverte de la fortification messine (ADFM) has managed the site. Fort Verny is currently the only fort of the fortified belt to be open to the public.

== Second World War ==
During the Second World War, the Group fortifications of Aisne was used by Nazi Germany. Its underground galleries provided an ideal refuge in case of air attack. From June 1942, a thousand skilled workers took shifts turns in the fort, which quickly became a true underground factory. These Eastern workers, Eastern country workers, machined and mounted aerial and marine torpedoes. These torpedoes are then routed to a depot of the German Navy, located in the woods of Cattenom. When the Battle of Metz happens, the former stronghold is declared fortress Reich by Hitler, and must be defended to the last by German troops. The defense is thus organized around the Group Fortifications of Aisne and the other forts of Metz.

But the US offensive, launched September 7, 1944 on the west line is cut short. American troops will eventually stop on the Moselle, despite taking two bridgeheads south of Metz. The forts were better defended than they had thought, so US troops are now figuratively out of breath. General McLain, in agreement with the General Walker, decided to suspend the attacks, pending new plans of the General Staff of the 90th Infantry Division. When hostilities resumed in October after a month of rain, the soldiers of the 462th Volks-Grenadier-Division still firmly hold their positions even if the supplies are more difficult, because of the artillery and the frequent bombings.

On November 9, 1944, the Air Force sends no less than 1,299 heavy bombers, B-17s and B-24s, and drops 3,753 tons of bombs, and 1,000 to 2,000 books on the fortifications and strategic points in the combat zone of IIIrd army. Most bombers, having dropped bombs without visibility at over 20,000 feet, miss their military objectives. In Metz, the 689 loads of bombs destined to strike the fort Joan of Arc and six other forts, identified as priority targets, merely cause collateral damage, proving once again the inadequacy of the massive bombing of military targets.

The fort Jeanne-d’Arc was the last of the forts of Metz to disarm. Determined German resistance, bad weather and floods, inopportunity, and a general tendency to underestimate the firepower of the fortifications of Metz, have helped slow the US offensive, giving the opportunity to the German Army to withdraw in good order to the Saar. The objective of the German staff, which was to stall the US troops at Metz for the longest possible time before they could reach the front of the Siegfried Line, is largely achieved.

== Sources ==
- Inge und Dieter Wernet: Die Feste Wagner, A.D.F.M., 2002.
- Inge und Dieter Wernet: Die Feste Wagner, A.D.F.M., Helios-Verlag, Aix-la-Chapelle, 2010.
- Educational file on fort-de-verny.org

== See also ==
- Forts of Metz
- Fortifications of Metz
- Battle of Metz
