= Fort Lauvallieres =

Infanterie-Werk Belle-Croix/Fort Lauvallieres

Site information
- Type: fort of type von Biehler

Location
- Coordinates: 49.071°N 6.144°E

Site history
- Built: 1908-1914
- Fate: not used

Garrison information
- Garrison: 200 men

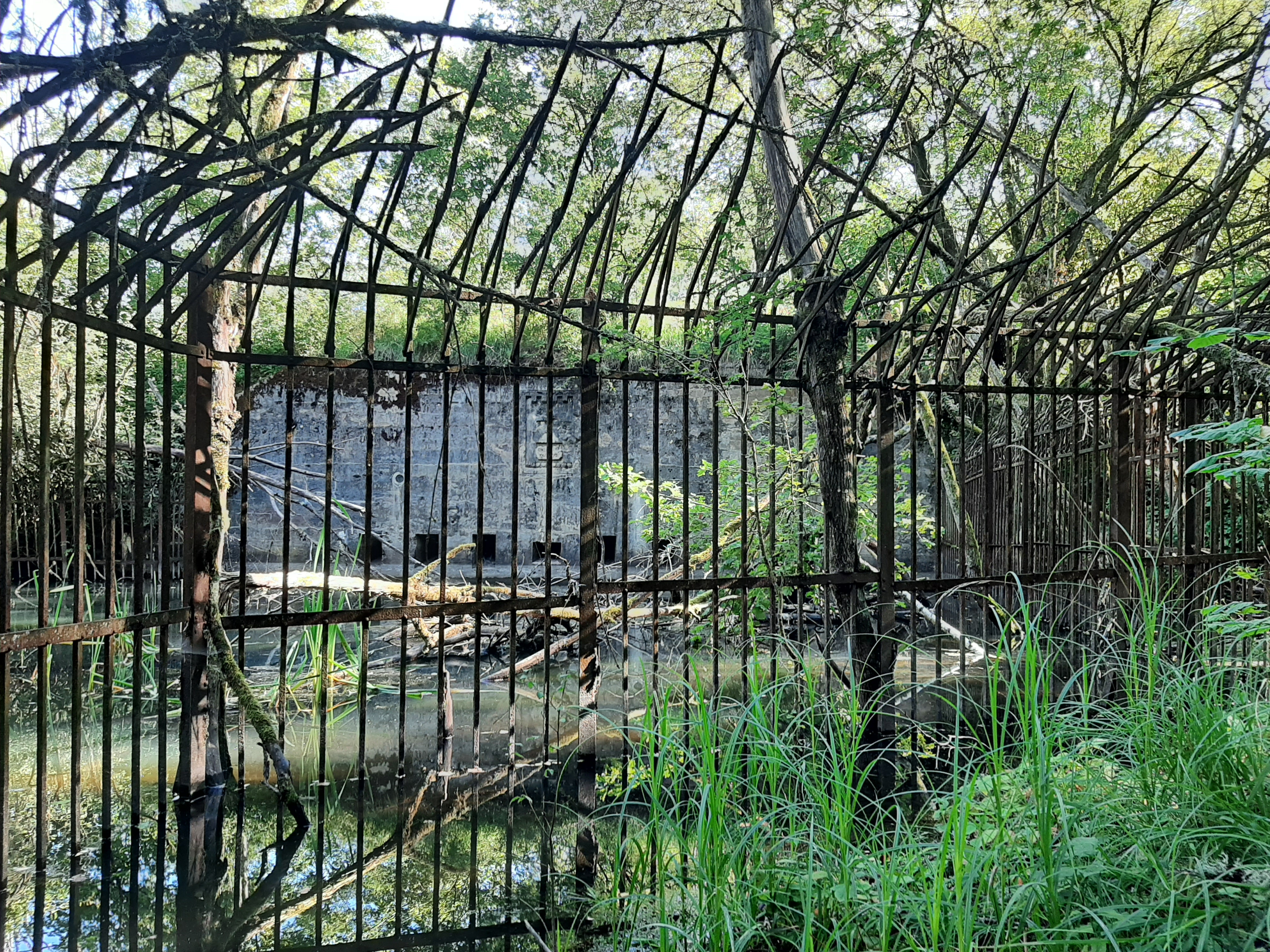

The Infanterie-Werk Belle-Croix, renamed Fort Lauvallière after 1919, is a military installation near Metz. It is part of the second fortified belt of forts of Metz.

== Historical context ==
While it was German territory, Metz' garrison grew from 15,000-20,000 men when after the Franco-Prussian War to more than 25,000 at the start of World War I, gradually becoming the premier stronghold of the German Reich. Built in the early 20th century, the infantry works and barracks of Lauvallière completed the Second fortified belt of Metz composed of Festen Wagner (1904-1912), Crown Prince (1899 - 1905), Leipzig (1907–1912), empress (1899-1905), Lorraine (1899-1905), Freiherr von der Goltz (1907–1916), Haeseler (1899-1905), Prince Regent Luitpold (1907-1914) and I-werke Belle-Croix (1908-1914). This fort was part of a wider program of fortifications called "Moselstellung" encompassing fortresses scattered between Thionville and Metz in the Moselle valley. The aim of Germany was to protect against a French campaign to take back Alsace-Lorraine from the German Empire.

== Overall design ==
The fortification system was designed to accommodate the growing advances in artillery since the end of the 19th century. Based on new defensive concepts, such as dispersal and concealment, the fortified group was to be, in case of attack, an impassable barrier for French forces. From 1899, the Schlieffen plan of the German General Staff designed the fortifications of the Moselstellung, between Metz and Thionville to be like a lock for blocking any advance of French troops in case of conflict. This concept of a fortified line on the Moselle was a significant innovation compared to the Séré de Rivières system developed by the French. It later inspired the engineers of the Maginot Line.

== Construction and facilities ==
Built between 1908 and 1914 in the northeast of Metz in Moselle, the infantry works occupy a plot of 47 ha. It is located in the communes of Coincy, Nouilly and Vantoux near the intersection of the Saarbrücken and Saarlouis roads. The fort is named after the hamlet of Lauvallières, located two kilometers to the east in Nouilly. A cross carved on the building reads "Belle-Croix 1908-1912".

The fort could hold two hundred men and had :

- three infantry observatories with armored fixed turrets and thirteen gatehouse observatories;
- a telephone to central command;
- central heating;
- two hundred meters of underground galleries;
- four 22-horsepower diesel engines driving four dynamos (14.5 kW).

== Successive assignments ==
From 1890 the garrison relief is guaranteed by the fort troops Corps XVI stationed at Metz and Thionville. In November 1918, the fort was again occupied by the French army. In early September 1944, at the beginning of the Battle of Metz, the German command integrates the fort into the defensive system set up around Metz.

== See as well ==
- Forts of Metz
- Fortifications of Metz
- Battle of Metz
