= Group Fortifications Francois-de-Guise =

Feste Leipzig/Fort Francois-de-Guise

Site information
- Type: fort of type von Biehler

Location
- Coordinates: 49.084056°N 6.032196°E

Site history
- Built: 1907–1912
- Fate: not used

Garrison information
- Garrison: 360 men

The Feste Leipzig, renamed Group Fortifications Francois-de-Guise after 1919 by the French, is a military structure located in the municipality of Châtel-Saint-Germain, close to Metz. It is part of the second fortified belt of forts of Metz and had its baptism of fire in late 1944, when the Battle of Metz occurred.

== Historical context ==
During the annexation, Metz was a German garrison of between 15,000 and 20,000 men at the beginning of the period and exceeded 25,000 men just before the First World War, gradually becoming the first stronghold of the German Reich. The Feste Lothringen completed the Second fortified belt of Metz composed of Festen Wagner (1904–1912), Crown Prince (1899–1905), Leipzig (1907–1912), empress (1899–1905), Lorraine (1899–1905), Freiherr von der Goltz (1907–1916), Haeseler (1899–1905), Prince Regent Luitpold (1907–1914) and Infantry-Werk Belle-Croix (1908–1914).

== Overall design ==
The Group Fortification Francois de Guise was built by Germany in the first annexation. It was part of a wider program of fortifications called "Moselstellung", which encompassed fortresses scattered between Thionville and Metz in the valley Moselle. The aim of Germany was to protect against a French attack to retake Alsace-Lorraine from the German Empire. The fortification system was designed to accommodate the growing advances in artillery since the end of the 19th century. Based on new defensive concepts, such as dispersal and concealment, the fortified group was to be, in case of attack, an impassable barrier for French forces.

From 1899, the Schlieffen Plan of the German General Staff designed the fortifications of the Moselstellung, between Metz and Thionville, to be like a lock for blocking any advance of French troops in case of conflict. This concept of a fortified line on the Moselle was a significant innovation compared to Système Séré de Rivières developed by the French. It later inspires the engineers of the Maginot Line.

== Construction and facilities ==
The Group Fortification Francois de Guise, over an area of 80 hectares, was built from 1907 to 1912. The perimeter defense of the Group Fortification Francois de Guise was provided by two infantry positions, the Folie works and Leipzig works. The three fortified barracks could receive 360 men. The batteries are equipped with rotating turret howitzers 100 mm wide. Scattered on the high points, 6 observation turrets and 12 observation posts allow perfect monitoring of the sector. Each infantry item has a power plant equipped with three diesel 20 hp engines. The works are scattered over a wide area and concealed by the natural topography. All works, connected by 270 m of underground galleries, are surrounded by a network of barbed wire.

== Successive assignments ==
From 1890 the garrison relief was guaranteed by the fort troops Corps XVI stationed at Metz and Thionville. From 1914 to 1918, the fort was spared any fighting, and used simply as outpost by the German army. After 1918, the Group Fortification Francis de Guise was invested by the French army. In 1939, it serves as an outpost for the French army. Taken over by the Germans in June 1940, it served as a training ground. Beginning in September 1944, during the Battle of Metz, German troops reorganized its defense, and integrated it into the defensive system set up around Metz. After World War II, the fort was taken over by the French army. The fortified group comprising forts Leipzig and Madness was used during the Cold War from 1953 to 1958 as part of air defense, having a transmission vocation. This place was then the Work "F" of the DAT ("Radar Station Master 40/921").

After a War command post exercise in 1963, it became in 1967 the command center of the Tactical Air Force 1 Aerial region (FATAC), but was transferred to the Air Base 128-Metz Frescaty two years earlier. "Nuclear Biological Chemical" protection (NBC) at the works was designed then.

== Second World War ==
After the departure of French troops in June 1940, the German army reinvested the fort. In early September 1944, the Battle of Metz began. The German command integrated the defensive system set up around Metz. On September 2, 1944, Metz was declared, in effect by the Reich, fortress Hitler. The fortress was required to be defended to the last by German troops, whose leaders were all sworn to the Führer The defense is organized around the forts of Metz. From September 6, 1944, the Group Fortification Francis de Guise serves as a forward base on the front line for German units of the 462th Volks-Grenadier-Division. At that time, German troops are based firmly at the strengths of the sector, especially in the Group Fortification Francois de Guise, ideally located between the Group Fortification Lorraine, or Festivals Lorraine, and the Fort Jeanne d'Arc, or Fixed Empress. In the area of Amanvillers - Saint-Privat is held further north by the 1010th Backup Regiment of Colonel Richter of the 462th Infanterie-Division and further south by the Cadets of the Fahnenjunkerschule VI des Heeres, "Metz" under the command of Wehrmacht (army)Colonel Joachim von Siegroth.

On the morning of September 9, 1944, the American artillery rained shells on identified German positions, paving the way for the infantry and the tanks of Task force McConnell. Arriving in the Wood Jaumont US troops' 2nd Infantry regiment were taken under fire by Fort Kellermann. The German batteries eliminated, within moments, seven tanks and two freestanding guns, forcing the column to withdraw precipitately. Wanting to bypass the fortifications from the north, the Americans were soon under fire from a German counterattack before being stopped by gunfire from Group Fortification Lorraine. The artillery of the US campaign immediately resumed his attacks on the fortifications of the sector, but without great results considering the terrain and vegetation. The 3rd Battalion of the Task force, in charge of the right flank of the attack, fell on the fortified farmhouse of Moscou, (Note: At that same place, the French troops of Napoleon III repelled the assault of three German columns, August 18, 1870, at the Battle of Gravelotte.) a veritable redoubt between the German fortifications, before being taken under heavy fire from Gravelotte. The 2nd Battalion Task force, which was heading towards Vernéville with relative ease, was finally stopped by gunfire from a sunken road, west of Fort Francis de Guise. The day ended with a failure for Colonel Roffe, who regretted high losses—14 officers and 332 men—for "twenty odd forts". He therefore calls for air support from General Silvester.

On September 10, 1944, three squadrons of fighter-bombers dropped their bombs on the eastern sector of Amanvillers, where the fortifications were grouped. The P-47s reach their targets, but the 500-pound bombs have little effect on the reinforced concrete fortifications. The infantry attack was launched at 18:00, meeting fierce resistance. Despite the support of tanks, it stopped three hours later, out of breath. Towards Gravelotte, in the Woods Génivaux, American troops also destroyed the Officer Cadets of wehrmacht Colonel Siegroth that dominate the field. On September 10, 1944, the commander of the 7th Armored Division agreed to take a position near Roncourt to support a new attack of the 2nd Infantry regiment.

On September 11, 1944, at 6:30 am, the tanks were headed for Pierrevillers, wiping the passage with sporadic gunfire, they finally came across a roadblock, with fire coming from anti-tank guns, which were camouflaged and difficult to locate. The infantry, however, managed to take a position on the wooded slopes, northwest of the village of Bronvaux, too far, however, from the objective, which was to support the 2nd Infantry regiment. Despite several counterattacks by the 462th Infanterie Division, American troops arrive to take over the land in the late afternoon, after a rolling artillery barrage targeting fortifications in the sector, and which uses smoke shells for cover.

On September 13, 1944, the US military redeployed its troops on the front line to concentrate its attack on the fortifications. But fatigue and stress disoriented the men of the 2nd Infantry regiment, which were ultimately relieved on September 14. The 1st Battalion Task force, hard hit by the shelling of the 462th Volks-Grenadier-Division and specific small arms fire, had to withdraw with difficulty behind a screen of smoke rockets, more than five hundred meters from Amanvillers. Around 14:00, an air strike on Amanvillers did not allow the infantry to advance, the village being too close to the fortifications of the sector to be taken in full.

Fatigue and stress soon disoriented men of the 2nd Infantry Regiment, who were finally relieved from this "Hell Hole » (Note: « Received warning order that we are to be relieved—which is good news, this is sure a hell hole » (Journal de marche du 3rd bataillon of 2nd Infantry Regiment of 14 September 1944).) on September 14, 1944. Two regiments, reinforced by the engineering companies of the 90th Infantry Division, took over in the area: the 357th Infantry Regiment of Colonel Barth took position along the Wood Jaumont, to the east of Saint-Privat-la-Montagne, while the 359th Infantry Regiment of Colonel Bacon took position to the east of Gravelotte.

On September 15, 1944, an attack was planned on the Canrobert sector of buildings and Kellermann sector to the north and Fort Jeanne d'Arc on the southern sector. The approach was difficult, German soldiers defending inch by inch. American bazookas were not effective on the concrete bunkers, and tanks, followed by armed sections of flamethrowers, throw themselves on the first German lines, neither reaching them, nor neutralizing them, nor taking them. General McLain then concluded that a frontal attack would be doomed to failure and ordered his troops to keep the pressure on the outposts of the 462th Volks-Grenadier-Division without attacking frontally forts Jeanne-d'Arc and Lorraine.

On September 16, 1944, in thick fog, the attack on Support Point Canrobert started at 10:00. It was stopped two hours later by the Fahnenjunker of Colonel Siegroth, who fought man-to-man without mercy. The Americans' 357th Infantry Regiment withdrew, leaving 72 soldiers in the field. At 5:00 pm, the 1st Battalion of the same regiment was stopped in its tracks by artillery and small arms. In the southern sector, the 2nd Battalion lost 15 officers and 117 men under heavy fire from mortars and automatic weapons from the buffer strip. At nightfall, the battalion advanced only 200 meters. Seeing that the Americans gradually ate away at their lines, the German artillery redoubled its fire, managing to contain the two regiments, and raising fears with General McLain of a new counterattack. Before the pugnacity of the elite troops of the 462th Volks-Grenadier-Division, General McLain, in agreement with the General Walker, decided to suspend the attacks, pending further plans of the General Staff of the 90th Infantry Division.

After a rainy and cold month of little fighting, fighting resumed early November 1944. On November 9, in preparation for the offensive on Metz, the Air Force sent no less than 1,299 heavy bombers, B-17s and B-24s, to drop 3,753 tons of bombs, and 1,000 to 2,000 books on fortifications and strategic points in the combat zone of IIIrd army. Most bombers, having dropped bombs without visibility at over 20,000 feet, missed their military objectives. In Metz, the 689 loads of bombs destined to strike Fort Jeanne d'Arc and six other forts, designated as priority targets, merely cause collateral damage, proving once again the inadequacy of the massive bombing of military targets.

At dawn on November 14, 1944, the 105 mm howitzers from the 359th Field Artillery Battalion opened fire on the area located on either side of Fort Jeanne d'Arc, between the Fort Francis de Guise and the Fort Driant to pave the way for the 379th Infantry regiment, whose goal was to reach the Moselle. The attack is focused on Fort Jeanne d'Arc, which ended up being completely encircled by US troops. After two deadly counterattacks against the men of Major Voss by the 462th Volksgrenadier division, German troops soon fell back to the Group Fortification. They would come out again. For the commander of Fort Jeanne-d'Arc, the finding was bitter: Losses are heavy and they did not prevent the Americans from reaching the Moselle.

Under pressure from the American artillery, and armored troops, the German units of the 462th Volks-Grenadier-Division eventually fell back on a more limited basis, before shutting themselves in the fort, West of Metz during the final assault on the old city of Lorraine. While the US military managed to pass the Moselle on November 18, 1944, the US command was forced to keep back forces to neutralize the elements of the 462th Volksgrenadier division still entrenched in the Group Fortification Francois de Guise and the forts surrounding. On the evening of November 23, 1944, shortly before midnight, the last detachments of the 379th Infantry Regiment withdraw from Moscou Farm, from the Farm St-Hubert, from the bunker south of Fort Guise and the Group Fortification Francois de Guise, leaving room for fresh troops of 5th Infantry Division. The Fort de Bois-la-Dame still held by a hundred men of the 462th Volks-Grenadier-Division, the Fort St Hubert and the Fort de Marival, each still manned by fifty men, finally surrendered November 26, 1944.

Fort Jeanne d'Arc was the last of the forts of Metz to disarm. Determined German resistance, bad weather and floods, inopportunity, and a general tendency to underestimate the firepower of the fortifications of Metz, helped slow the US offensive, giving the opportunity to the German Army to withdraw in good order to the Saar. The objective of the German staff, which was to stall US troops for the longest possible time at Metz before they could reach the front of the Siegfried Line, was largely achieved.

== See also ==
- Forts of Metz
- Fortifications of Metz
- Battle of Metz
