= Group Fortification Yser =

Feste Prinz Regent Luitpold/Group Fortification Yser

Site information
- Type: fort of type von Biehler

Location
- Location within France
- Coordinates: 49.012°N 6.141°E

Site history
- Built: 1907-1914
- Fate: unused

Garrison information
- Garrison: 560 men

The Feste Prinz Regent Luitpold, renamed Group Fortification Yser after 1919, is a military installation near Metz. It is part of the second fortified belt of forts of Metz and had its baptism of fire in late 1944, when the Battle of Metz occurred.

== Historical context ==
During The Annexation, Metz, will oscillate between a German garrison of 15,000 and 20,000 men at the beginning of period and will exceed 25,000 men just before the First World War, gradually becoming the first stronghold of German Reich.

The Feste Prinz Regent Luitpold completes the Second fortified belt of Metz composed of Festen Wagner (1904-1912), Crown Prince (1899 - 1905), Leipzig (1907–1912), empress (1899-1905), Lorraine (1899-1905), Freiherr von der Goltz (1907–1916), Haeseler (1899-1905), Prince Regent Luitpold (1907-1914) and Infantry-Werk Belle-Croix (1908-1914).

The Group Fortification Yser, or Feste Prince Regent Luitpold, was part of a wider program of fortifications called "Moselstellung", encompassing fortresses scattered between Thionville and Metz in the valley Moselle. The aim of Germany was to protect against a French attack to take back Alsace-Lorraine and Moselle from the German Empire. The fortification system was designed to accommodate the growing advances in artillery since the end of the 19th century. Based on new defensive concepts, such as dispersal and concealment, the fortified group was to be, in case of attack, an impassable barrier for French forces.

== Overall design ==
The protection of the perimeter of Group Fortification Yser is provided by a set of infantry positions, fortified barracks and artillery batteries scattered over a wide area and concealed by the natural topography. From 1899, the Schlieffen plan of the German General Staff designed the fortifications of the Moselstellung, between Metz and Thionville to be like a lock for blocking any advance of French troops in case of conflict. This concept of a fortified line on the Moselle was a significant innovation compared to système Séré de Rivières developed by the French. It later inspired the engineers of the Maginot Line.

== Construction and facilities ==
Covering an area of 83 ha, the Feste Prince Regent Luitpold is constructed from 1907 to 1914. The group fortification has 2 fortified barracks and can accommodate a total of 560 men. It has 8 pieces of artillery, 6 of them 100mm and 2 of them 77mm. It has eight domes and twenty observation points and lookouts. The various items are connected by 1,700m of underground galleries. In its water tanks, it has 2,640 m^{3} of water. The energy required for its operation is ensured by seven diesel engines of 27 hp each.

== Successive assignments ==
During The Annexation of Alsace-Lorraine, the fort receives a garrison of gunners belonging to the XVIth Army Corps. From 1914-1918, it served as a relay for the German soldiers at the front post. Its equipment and weapons are then at the forefront of military technology. In 1919, the fort was occupied by the French army. After the departure of French troops in June 1940, the German army reinvests the fort. In early September 1944, at the beginning of the Battle of Metz, the German command integrates the fort into the defensive system set up around Metz.

== Second World War ==
On September 2, 1944, Metz is declared fortress Reich by Hitler. The fortress must be defended to the last by German troops, whose leaders were all sworn to the Führer. The next day, September 3, 1944, General Krause, then commander of the fortress of Metz, established his High Command with the main command post in the barracks of fort Alvensleben. Fort Plappeville is indeed located on the side of the US attack in the west, just 4 km from downtown Metz. The same day, the troops of General Krause took position on a line from Pagny-sur-Moselle to Mondelange, passing west of Metz by Chambley, Mars-la-Tour, Jarny and Briey. After an initial withdrawal, on 6 September 1944, the German lines now rely solidly on the western sector of the forts of Metz, especially on forts Lorraine, Jeanne D'Arc and Driant.

The US offensive launched September 7, 1944, is cut short. Troops must stop on the Moselle, despite gaining two bridgeheads south of Metz. The forts are better defended against US attack than expected, so US troops are now out of breath. General McLain, in agreement with the General Walker, decided to suspend the attacks, pending further plans of the General Staff of the 90 Infantry Division. While the troops of the Third US Army sit listening to Marlene Dietrich, German troops are taking advantage of the lull in fighting to reorganize. Reserve troops of the 462th Volks-Grenadier-Division fill in with, into the forts of the sector, the elite troops of SS Colonel Siegroth. (Note: For his commitment during the Battle of Metz, Siegroth obtained the Ritterkreuz des Eisernen Kreuzes, October 18, 1944.)

When hostilities resume in November 1944 after a rainy month, the soldiers of the 462th Volks-Grenadier-Division still hold firmly the forts of Metz, though supplies are more difficult under the artillery and the frequent bombings. On November 9, 1944, the Air Force sends no less than 1,299 heavy bombers, B-17s and B-24s, to drop 3,753 tons of bombs, and 1,000 to 2,000 books on fortifications and strategic points in the combat zone of IIIrd army. Most bombers, having dropped bombs without visibility at over 20 000 feet, miss their military objectives. In Metz, the 689 loads of bombs, destined to strike the fort Joan of Arc and six other forts designated as priority targets, merely cause collateral damage. At Thionville and to Saarbrücken, the result is inconclusive, proving once again the inadequacy of the massive bombing of military targets.

By mid-November 1944, the XIIth and XXth US Army corps are trying to take the fortifications of Metz in a pincer movement. 95th Infantry Division must focus its efforts on the western front of Metz, while 5th division must outflank the German lines north and south. The encircling attack on the US military finally succeeds, after three days of uncertainty. On the evening of November 17, 1944, the situation of the German defenders has become critical. The able-bodied men of 462th Volks-Grenadier-Division are mostly surrounded in the forts of Metz. The remaining troops, fragmented in the extreme, hold key positions on the outskirts of the city. On 22 November 1944, the city falls to the Americans, but certain forts still resist for two long weeks. On December 6, 1944, the fort Saint-Quentin surrenders with its large garrison. The Fort Plappeville disarms the next day. The fort Jeanne-d’Arc, probably because it was controlled by the staff of the 462th Volks-Grenadier-Division and defended by a battalion of fusiliers, is the last of the forts of Metz to disarm, on December 13, 1944.

Determined German resistance, bad weather and floods, inopportunity, and a general tendency to underestimate the firepower of the fortifications of Metz, have helped slow the US offensive, giving the opportunity to the German Army to withdraw in good order to the Saar. The objective of the German staff, which was to stall US troops at Metz for the longest possible time before they could reach the front of the Siegfried Line, is largely achieved.

== See as well ==
- Forts of Metz
- Fortifications of Metz
- Battle of Metz
