= Ancy-sur-Moselle =

- Part of Ancy-Dornot
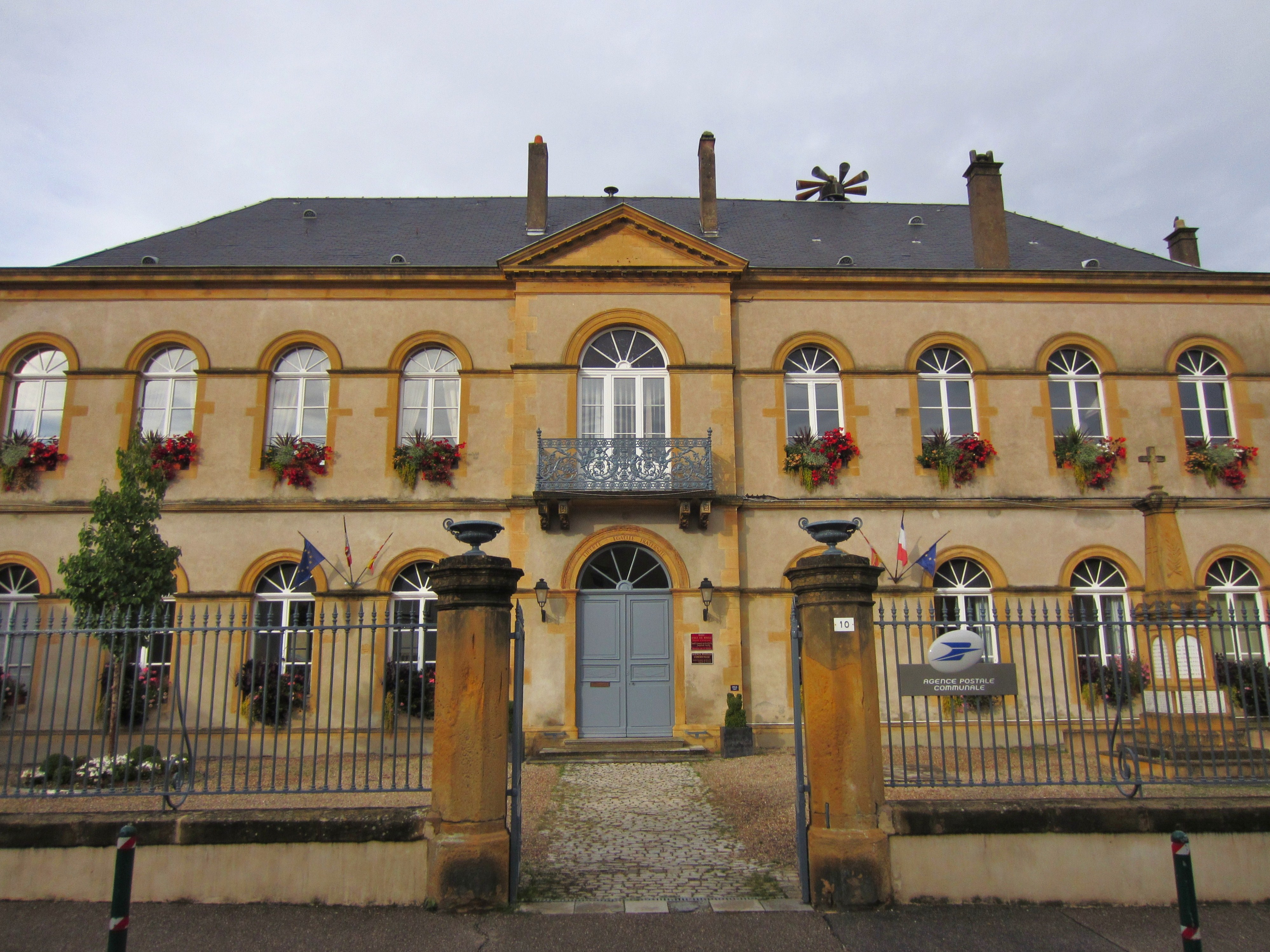
- Ancy-sur-Moselle Town hall

- Coat of arms
- Location of Ancy-sur-Moselle
- Location within France Location within Grand Est
- Coordinates: 49°03′27″N 6°03′32″E
- Country: France
- Region: Grand Est
- Department: Moselle
- Arrondissement: Metz
- Canton: Les Coteaux de Moselle
- Commune: Ancy-Dornot
- Area^{1}: 9.12 km^{2} (3.52 sq mi)
- Elevation: 175 m (574 ft)
- Highest elevation: 364 m (1,194 ft)
- Lowest elevation: 167 m (548 ft)
- Population (2022): 1,312
  - Density: 144/km^{2} (373/sq mi)
- Time zone: UTC+01:00 (CET)
  - Summer (DST): UTC+02:00 (CEST)
- Postal code: 57130
- ^{1} French Land Register data, which excludes lakes, ponds, glaciers > 1 km^{2} (0.386 sq mi or 247 acres) and river estuaries.

Ancy-sur-Moselle (German: Ancy an der Mosel, from 1918: Anzig) is a former commune in the Moselle department in northeastern France. On 1 January 2016, it was merged into the new commune Ancy-Dornot.

== Population ==
Historical population
| Year | Pop. | ±% p.a. |
|---|---|---|
| 1962 | 1,164 | — |
| 1968 | 1,216 | +0.73% |
| 1975 | 1,283 | +0.77% |
| 1982 | 1,288 | +0.06% |
| 1990 | 1,339 | +0.49% |
| 1999 | 1,475 | +1.08% |
| 2006 | 1,456 | −0.19% |
| 2022 | 1,312 | −0.65% |
Source: EHESS and INSEE

== See also ==
- Communes of the Moselle department
- Parc naturel régional de Lorraine
