= Ancy-Dornot =

- Commune
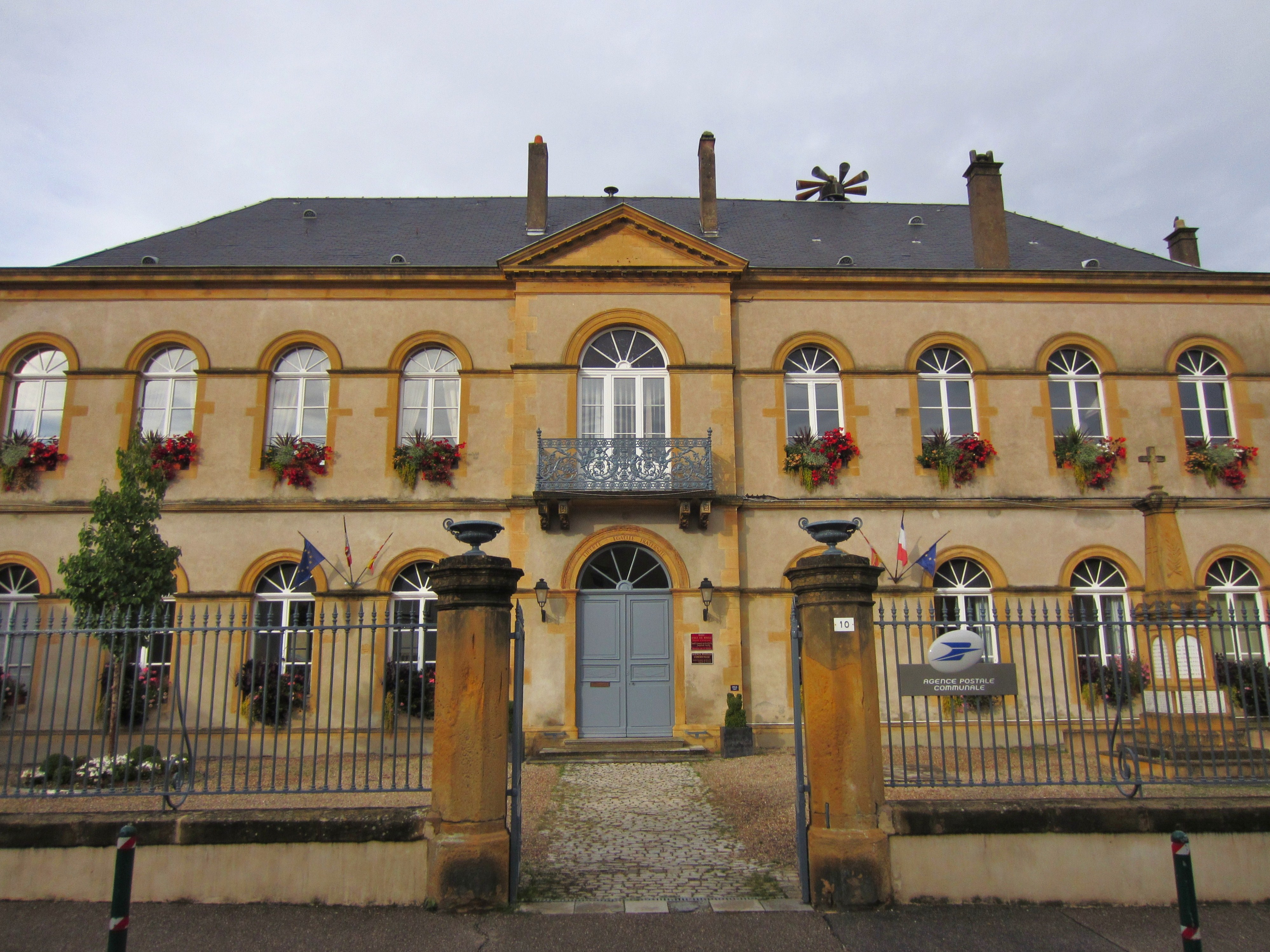
- The town hall in Ancy
- Location of Ancy-Dornot
- Location within France Location within Grand Est
- Coordinates: 49°03′25″N 6°03′29″E
- Country: France
- Region: Grand Est
- Department: Moselle
- Arrondissement: Metz
- Canton: Les Coteaux de Moselle

Government
  - Mayor (2020–2026): Gilles Soulier
- Area^{1}: 10.25 km^{2} (3.96 sq mi)
- Population (2023): 1,490
  - Density: 145/km^{2} (376/sq mi)
- Time zone: UTC+01:00 (CET)
  - Summer (DST): UTC+02:00 (CEST)
- INSEE/Postal code: 57021 /57130
- ^{1} French Land Register data, which excludes lakes, ponds, glaciers > 1 km^{2} (0.386 sq mi or 247 acres) and river estuaries.

Ancy-Dornot (French pronunciation: [ɑ̃si dɔʁno]; German: Anzig-Dorningen) is a commune in the Moselle department of northeastern France. The municipality was established on 1 January 2016 and consists of the former communes of Ancy-sur-Moselle and Dornot.

== See also ==
- Communes of the Moselle department
