= Vollrath Lübbe =

- Born: 4 March 1894; Klein Lunow, German Empire
- Died: 4 April 1969 (aged 75) Hannover, West Germany
- Allegiance: German Empire; Weimar Republic; Nazi Germany
- Branch: German Army
- Service years: 1914–1945
- Rank: Generalleutnant
- Commands: 2nd Panzer Division; 81st Infantry Division; 462nd Volksgrenadier Division
- Conflicts: World War I; World War II; Invasion of Poland; Battle of France; Invasion of Yugoslavia; Battle of Greece; Operation Barbarossa; Battle of Moscow; Battles of Rzhev; Battle of Kursk; Vistula–Oder Offensive
- Awards: Knight's Cross of the Iron Cross

Vollrath Lübbe (4 March 1894 – 4 April 1969) was a German general in the Wehrmacht. A veteran of World War I, he rose to command several divisions during World War II. He was a recipient of the Knight's Cross of the Iron Cross, awarded by Nazi Germany to recognise successful military leadership.

== Biography ==
Born in 1894, Lübbe joined the army of Imperial Germany in 1912 and was posted to the 103rd Infantry Regiment. He served in World War I and then in the postwar Reichsheer which in turn became the Wehrmacht.

Having led the 13th Cavalry Regiment since 1939, Lübbe was posted to the 2nd Panzer Division's 2nd Rifle Brigade (2nd Schuetzen Brigade) in 1941. He was appointed to temporary command of the division itself on 16 January 1942 for a few weeks. He was promoted to generalmajor (Note: In the Wehrmacht, the rank of generalmajor is equivalent to that of brigadier general in the United States Army.) on 1 October 1942, shortly after he resumed command of 2nd Panzer Division which took part in many defensive actions during the 1942–43 period as well as the Battle of Kursk. On 17 August 1943 he was awarded the Knight's Cross of the Iron Cross and two months later was promoted to generalleutnant. (Note: The rank of generalleutnant is equivalent to that of major general in the United States Army.)

Transferred to the infantry in early 1944, on 5 April 1944, Lübbe was appointed commander of 81st Infantry Division, which had been heavily depleted in the fighting retreat from Leningrad. His period of command was brief, a period of two months, before being replaced. After a few months he took over the 462nd Volksgrenadier Division on 15 October 1944. Shortly after taking command, the division was shifted to the town of Metz. Under siege from the United States Third Army from early November, Lübbe suffered a stroke on 8 November and had to be relieved. Lübbe was captured by Soviet troops at the end of the war and remained a prisoner of war until October 1955.

== Notes ==
Footnotes

Citations

Military offices
Preceded by Oberst Karl Fabiunke	Commander of 2nd Panzer Division; 1 October 1942–31 January 1944	Succeeded by Generalleutnant Heinrich Freiherr von Lüttwitz
Preceded by Generalleutnant Erich Schopper	Commander of 81st Infantry Division; 5 April–1 July 1944	Succeeded by Generalmajor der Reserve Dr. Ernst Meiners
Preceded by Generalleutnant Walter Krause	Commander of 462nd Volksgrenadier Division; 15 October–8 November 1944	Succeeded by Generalmajor Heinrich Kittel
