= Ars-Laquenexy =

- Commune
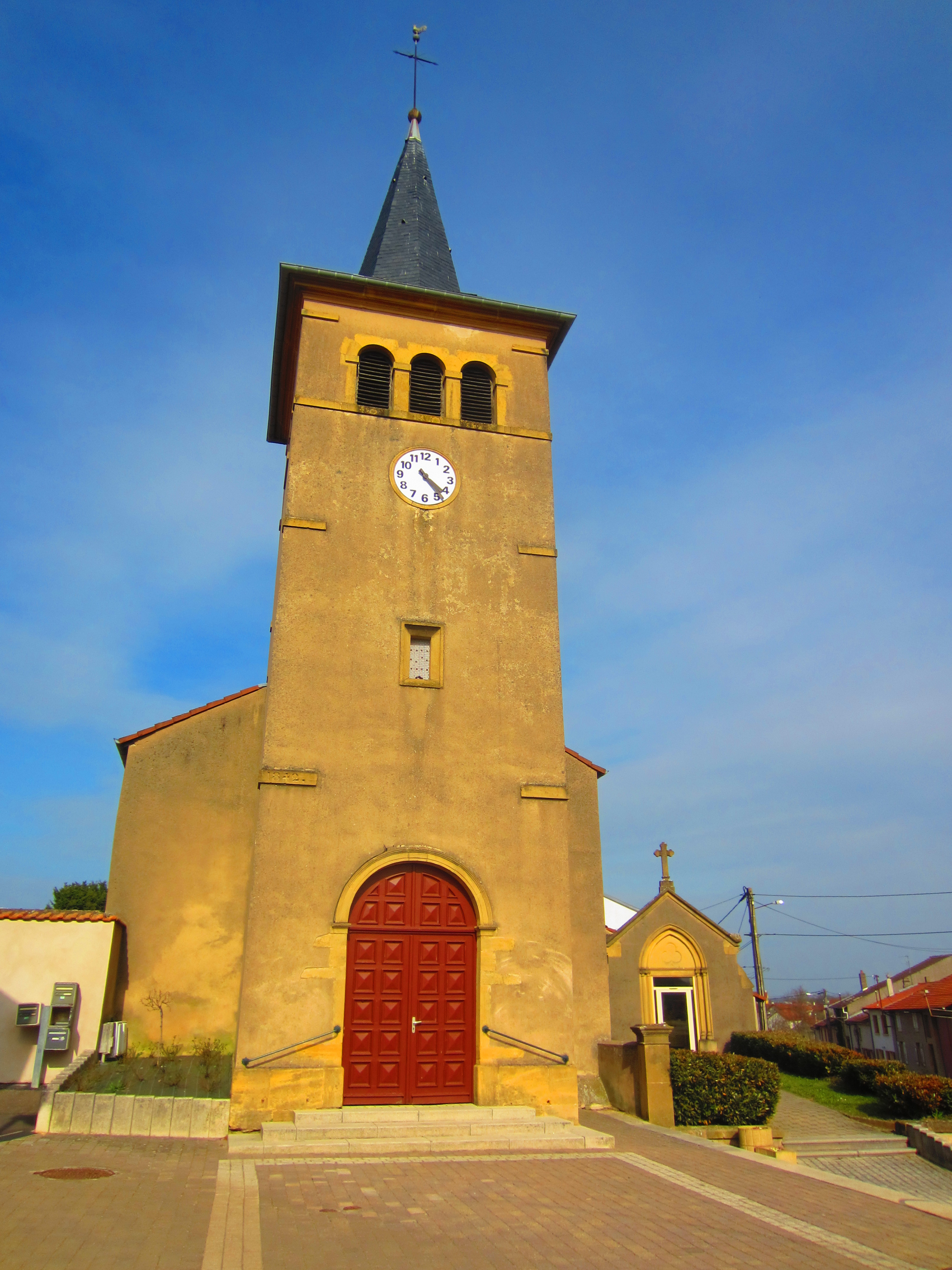
- The church in Ars-Laquenexy

- Coat of arms
- Location of Ars-Laquenexy
- Location within France Location within Grand Est
- Coordinates: 49°05′39″N 6°16′19″E
- Country: France
- Region: Grand Est
- Department: Moselle
- Arrondissement: Metz
- Canton: Le Pays Messin
- Intercommunality: Metz Métropole

Government
  - Mayor (2020–2026): Dominique Strebly
- Area^{1}: 6.25 km^{2} (2.41 sq mi)
- Elevation: 236 m (774 ft)
- Highest elevation: 256 m (840 ft)
- Lowest elevation: 207 m (679 ft)
- Population (2023): 934
  - Density: 149/km^{2} (387/sq mi)
- Time zone: UTC+01:00 (CET)
  - Summer (DST): UTC+02:00 (CEST)
- INSEE/Postal code: 57031 /57530
- ^{1} French Land Register data, which excludes lakes, ponds, glaciers > 1 km^{2} (0.386 sq mi or 247 acres) and river estuaries.

Ars-Laquenexy (French pronunciation: [aʁs lakənɛksi]; German: Ars bei Kenchen) is a commune in the Moselle department in Grand Est in northeastern France.

== Population ==
Historical population
Year	Pop.	±% p.a.
1968	205	—
1975	421	+10.83%
1982	541	+3.65%
1990	741	+4.01%
1999	741	+0.00%
2007	879	+2.16%
2012	956	+1.69%
2017	910	−0.98%
2023	934	+0.43%
Source: INSEE

== See also ==
- Communes of the Moselle department
