= Jury, Moselle =

Jury
- Commune
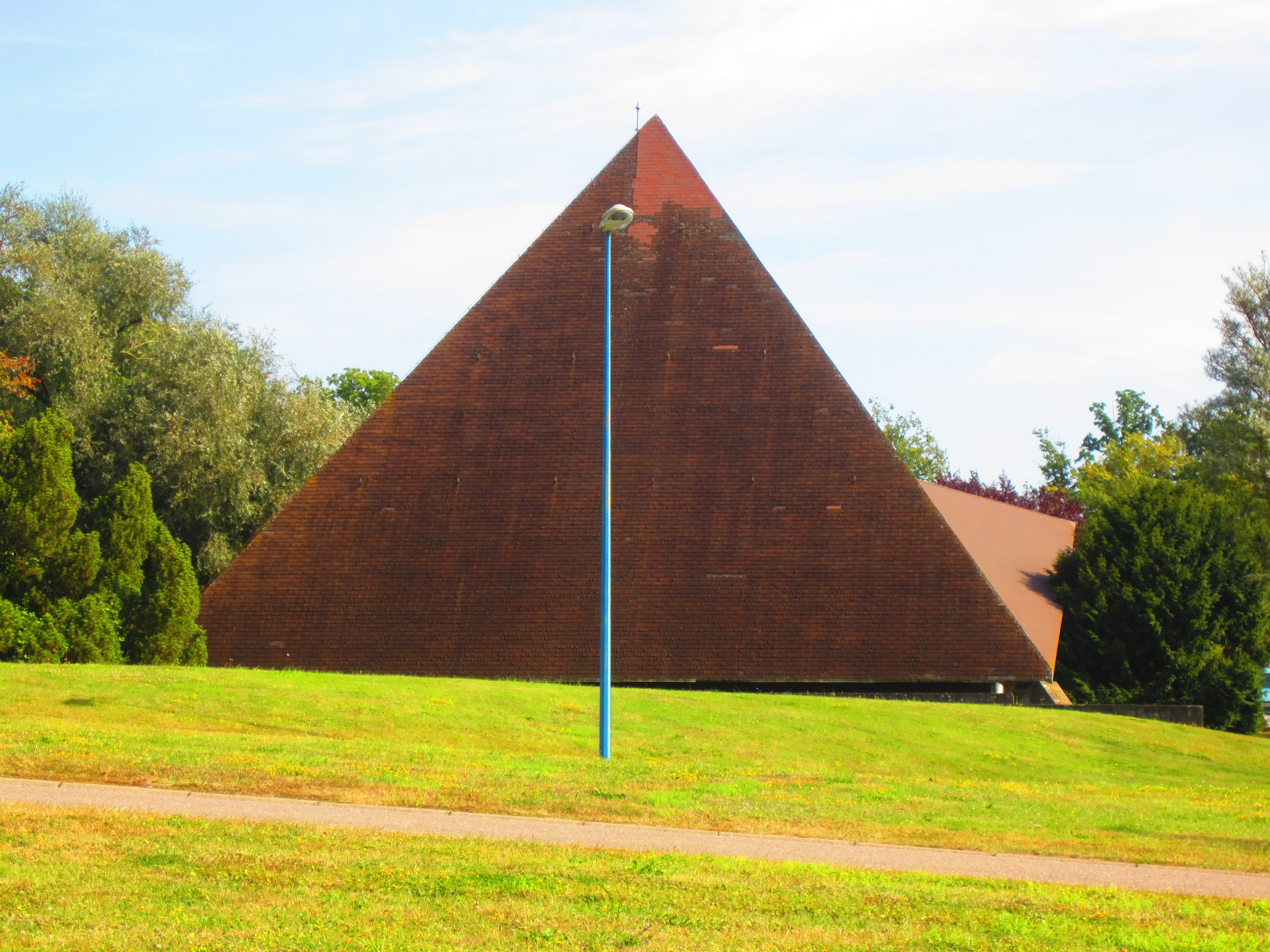
- The chapel in Jury

- Coat of arms
- Location of Jury
- Location within France Location within Grand Est
- Coordinates: 49°04′14″N 6°15′15″E
- Country: France
- Region: Grand Est
- Department: Moselle
- Arrondissement: Metz
- Canton: Le Pays Messin
- Intercommunality: Metz Métropole

Government
  - Mayor (2020–2026): Stanislas Smiarowski
- Area^{1}: 3.17 km^{2} (1.22 sq mi)
- Elevation: 200 m (660 ft)
- Highest elevation: 245 m (804 ft)
- Lowest elevation: 191 m (627 ft)
- Population (2023): 1,408
  - Density: 444/km^{2} (1,150/sq mi)
- Time zone: UTC+01:00 (CET)
  - Summer (DST): UTC+02:00 (CEST)
- INSEE/Postal code: 57351 /57245
- ^{1} French Land Register data, which excludes lakes, ponds, glaciers > 1 km^{2} (0.386 sq mi or 247 acres) and river estuaries.

Jury (French pronunciation: [ʒyʁi]; German: Giringen) is a commune in the Moselle department in Grand Est in north-eastern France.

== See also ==
- Communes of the Moselle department
