= Dornot =

Commune in Moselle, France

- Part of Ancy-Dornot
- Coat of arms
- Location of Dornot
- Location within France Location within Grand Est
- Coordinates: 49°02′55″N 6°03′23″E
- Country: France
- Region: Grand Est
- Department: Moselle
- Arrondissement: Metz
- Canton: Les Coteaux de Moselle
- Commune: Ancy-Dornot
- Area^{1}: 1.13 km^{2} (0.44 sq mi)
- Elevation: 334 m (1,096 ft)
- Highest elevation: 336 m (1,102 ft)
- Lowest elevation: 168 m (551 ft)
- Population (2022): 162
  - Density: 143/km^{2} (371/sq mi)
- Time zone: UTC+01:00 (CET)
  - Summer (DST): UTC+02:00 (CEST)
- Postal code: 57130
- ^{1} French Land Register data, which excludes lakes, ponds, glaciers > 1 km^{2} (0.386 sq mi or 247 acres) and river estuaries.

Dornot (French pronunciation: [dɔʁno]; German: Dorningen) is a former commune in the Moselle department in north-eastern France. On 1 January 2016, it was merged into the new commune Ancy-Dornot. It is situated on the left bank of the river Moselle. Its population was 162 in 2022.

== History ==
In September 1944, American General George S. Patton led Walton Walker's XX Corps in a botched attempt to cross the Moselle at Dornot. The fierce fighting led to a defensive victory for the Germans. See Lorraine Campaign.

== See also ==
- Communes of the Moselle department
- Parc naturel régional de Lorraine
