= Verny, France =

Verny
- Commune
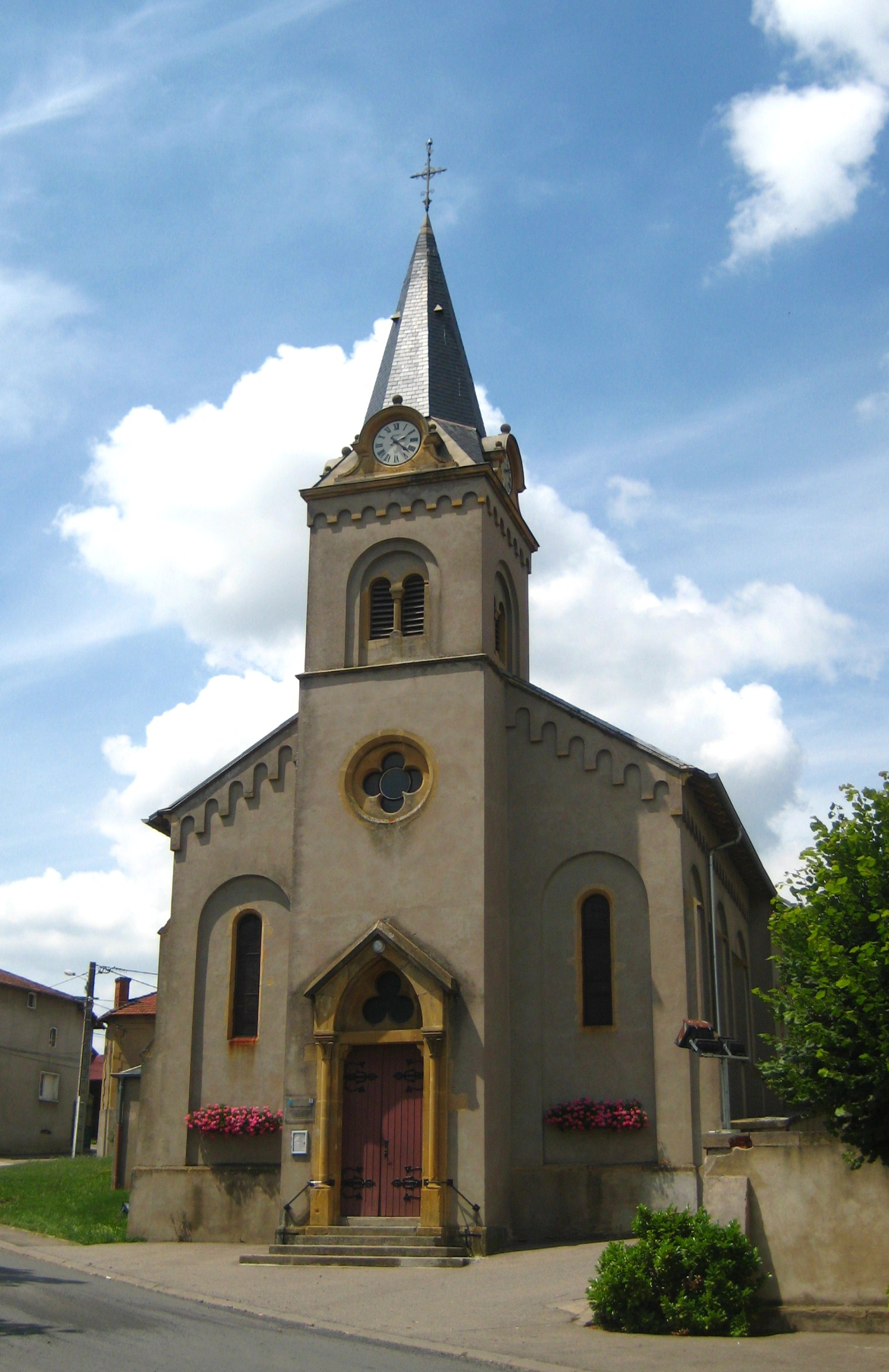
- The church in Verny

- Coat of arms
- Location of Verny
- Location within France Location within Grand Est
- Coordinates: 49°00′28″N 6°12′14″E
- Country: France
- Region: Grand Est
- Department: Moselle
- Arrondissement: Metz
- Canton: Faulquemont

Government
  - Mayor (2020–2026): Victorien Nicolas
- Area^{1}: 3.9 km^{2} (1.5 sq mi)
- Elevation: 100 m (330 ft)
- Highest elevation: 100 m (330 ft)
- Lowest elevation: 100 m (330 ft)
- Population (2023): 2,056
  - Density: 530/km^{2} (1,400/sq mi)
- Time zone: UTC+01:00 (CET)
  - Summer (DST): UTC+02:00 (CEST)
- INSEE/Postal code: 57708 /57420
- ^{1} French Land Register data, which excludes lakes, ponds, glaciers > 1 km^{2} (0.386 sq mi or 247 acres) and river estuaries.

Verny (French pronunciation: [vɛʁni]; German: Werningen) is a commune in the Moselle department in Grand Est in north-eastern France.

== Population ==
Historical population
Year	Pop.	±% p.a.
1968	257	—
1975	1,216	+24.86%
1982	1,467	+2.72%
1990	1,434	−0.28%
1999	1,500	+0.50%
2007	1,900	+3.00%
2012	1,925	+0.26%
2017	1,950	+0.26%
2023	2,056	+0.89%
Source: INSEE

== See also ==
- Communes of the Moselle department
