= Nouilly =

- Commune
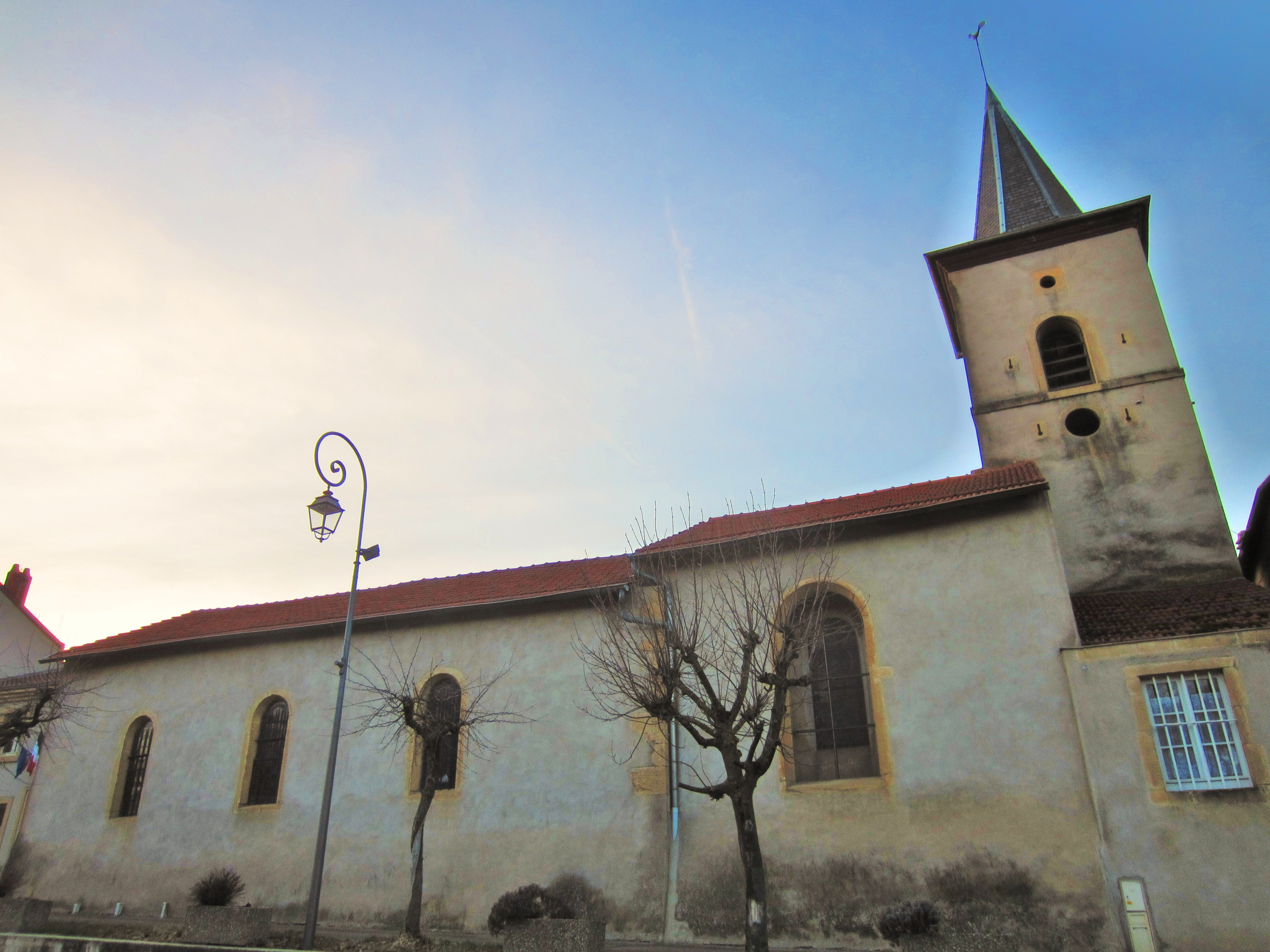
- The church in Nouilly
- Location of Nouilly
- Location within France Location within Grand Est
- Coordinates: 49°08′11″N 6°15′29″E
- Country: France
- Region: Grand Est
- Department: Moselle
- Arrondissement: Metz
- Canton: Le Pays Messin
- Intercommunality: Metz Métropole

Government
  - Mayor (2020–2026): Claude Valentin
- Area^{1}: 2.4 km^{2} (0.93 sq mi)
- Elevation: 195 m (640 ft)
- Highest elevation: 252 m (827 ft)
- Lowest elevation: 180 m (590 ft)
- Population (2023): 719
  - Density: 300/km^{2} (780/sq mi)
- Time zone: UTC+01:00 (CET)
  - Summer (DST): UTC+02:00 (CEST)
- INSEE/Postal code: 57512 /57645
- ^{1} French Land Register data, which excludes lakes, ponds, glaciers > 1 km^{2} (0.386 sq mi or 247 acres) and river estuaries.

Nouilly (French pronunciation: [nuji]; German: Niverlach) is a commune in the Moselle department in Grand Est in north-eastern France.

== See also ==
- Communes of the Moselle department
