= Gottlieb Graf von Haeseler =

Graf Gottlieb von Haeseler
- Gottlieb Graf von Haeseler in 1910
- Born: 18 January 1836; Potsdam, Kingdom of Prussia
- Died: 25 October 1919 (aged 83); Harnecop bei Wriezen, Germany
- Military career
- Allegiance: Kingdom of Prussia; North German Confederation; German Empire
- Branch: Heer
- Service years: 1853–1903
- Rank: Generalfeldmarschall
- Commands: 11. Ulanenregiment; 12. Kavalleriebrigade; 31. Kavalleriebrigade; 20. Division; 6. Division; XVI. Armee-Korps
- Conflicts: Second Schleswig War; Austro-Prussian War; Franco-Prussian War; World War I (in advisory capacity)
- Awards: Pour le Mérite

Gottlieb Ferdinand Albert Alexis Graf von Haeseler (January 19, 1836 – October 25, 1919) was a German military officer of the Imperial Wilhelmine period, with final rank of Generalfeldmarschall.

== Biography ==
Haeseler was born in Potsdam to August Alexis Eduard Haeseler and Albertine von Schönermark. He entered the Prussian army as Lieutenant in 1853 and became aide-de-camp of Prince Frederick Charles of Prussia in 1860. He served in the Danish-Prussian War (1864), the Austro-Prussian War (1866), and the Franco-Prussian War (1870–71). From 1879 he headed the military history department of the general staff, and from 1890 to 1903 he was General of the Cavalry and head of the XVI Army Corps in Metz. In 1905 he received the rank of a Generalfeldmarschall. From 1903 he was member of the Prussian House of Lords and worked for the development of the vocational school system. Haeseler died in Harnekop.

Among other things, the barracks of the paratrooper battalion No. 261 in Lebach/Saar are named after Haeseler.

== Awards ==
- Iron Cross II Class (1870)
- Iron Cross I Class (1870)
- Pour le Mérite (19 January 1873)
- Order of the Crown
- Merit Order of the Bavarian Crown
- Bavarian Military Merit Order
- Order of the Red Eagle
- Order of the White Falcon
- Friedrich Order
- Order of the Black Eagle 10.09.1897 (23.05.1903: Diamonds)
- House Order of Hohenzollern
- Order of Berthold the First (1895)
- House Order of Fidelity (1903)
- Austrian Imperial Order of Leopold (1877)
- Imperial Order of the Iron Crown with War Decoration (1864)

== Literature ==
- Jürgen Hahn-Butry (Hrsg.): Preußisch-deutsche Feldmarschälle und Großadmirale. Safari, Berlin 1938.
- Gottlieb Graf von Haeseler: Zehn Jahre im Stabe des Prinzen Friedrich Karl. 3 Bände. Mittler, Berlin 1910–1915 (Digitalisat: Band 2)
- Heinz Kraft (1966). "Haeseler, Gottlieb Graf von". Neue Deutsche Biographie (in German). Vol. 7. Berlin: Duncker & Humblot. p. 452.
