= 462nd Volksgrenadier Division =

Division No. 462 462nd Infantry Division 462nd Volksgrenadier Division
- Division Nr. 462; 462. Infanterie-Division; 462. Volksgrenadier-Division
- Active: 1942–1944
- Country: Nazi Germany
- Branch: Army
- Type: Volksgrenadier
- Size: Division
- Engagements: Second World War: Battle of Metz

The 462nd Volksgrenadier Division (German: 462. Volksgrenadier-Division) was a Volksgrenadier division of the German Army during the Second World War, active from 1942 to 1944. It was initially known as Division Nr. 462 and subsequently became the 462nd Infantry Division before assuming its Volksgrenadier designation in late 1944.

== Operational history ==
The 462nd Volksgrenadier Division was originally formed in October 1942 as a replacement division in the French town of Nancy, in the French Region of Lorraine Province, under the command of Generalmajor (Note: In the Wehrmacht, the rank of generalmajor is equivalent to that of brigadier general in the United States Army.) Otto Schilling. It took responsibility for many of the units of the former 182nd Reserve Division and was expanded with various fortress and training troops stationed at Luxembourg, Saarburg and Metz. After D-Day it was designated as a Volksgrenadier division and reorganized for combat and was dispatched to the frontlines in August 1944.

At the start of November 1944, now commanded by Generalleutnant (Note: Equivalent to the rank of major general in the United States Army.) Vollrath Lübbe, the division, less the 1216th Grenadier Regiment which had been transferred to the 19th Volksgrenadier Division, was defending the town of Metz from the United States Third Army. At this stage of the war, the division numbered 7,000 personnel. It surrendered the town on 28 November, having lost two commanders during the siege; Lübbe had suffered a stroke and his replacement, Generalmajor Heinrich Kittel, was wounded in action on 22 November. Over 1,000 men evaded capture by virtue of being evacuated as wounded prior to the fall of Metz. The division was disbanded shortly afterwards.

== Commanders ==
- Generalmajor Otto Schilling (5 October – 4 December 1942);
- Generalleutnant Ernest Guntzel (5–17 December 1942);
- Generalleutnant Hans von Sommerfeld (17 December 1942 – 14 July 1944);
- Generalleutnant Walter Krause (15 July – 14 October 1944);
- Generalleutnant Vollrath Lübbe (15 October – 8 November 1944);
- Generalmajor Heinrich Kittel (8–22 November 1944);
- Oberst Joachim Wagner (22–28 November 1944).

== Notes ==
Footnotes

Citations
