= Heinrich Kittel =

German general

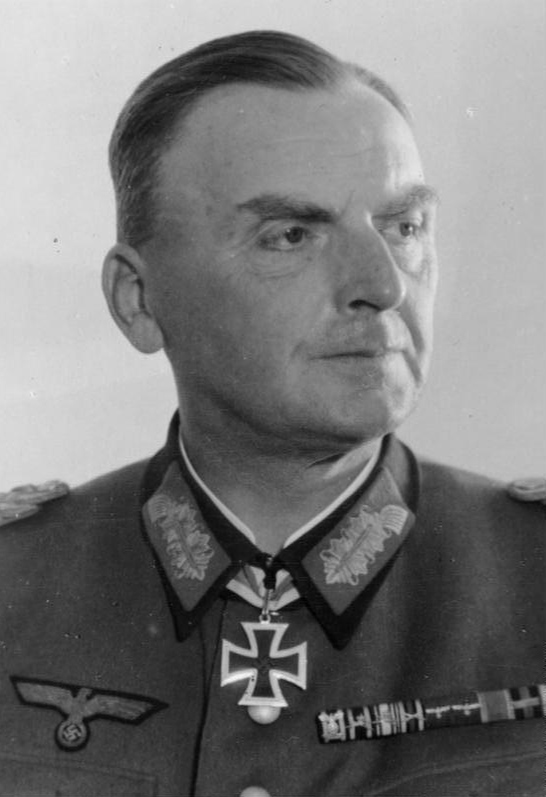
- Born: 31 October 1892
- Died: 5 March 1969 (aged 76)
- Military career
- Allegiance: Nazi Germany
- Branch: Army (Wehrmacht)
- Rank: Generalleutnant
- Commands: 462nd Volksgrenadier Division
- Conflicts: World War I World War II
- Awards: Knight's Cross of the Iron Cross

Heinrich Kittel (31 October 1892 – 5 March 1969) was a German general during World War II who commanded the 462nd Infantry Division. As a prisoner of war, he was interned at Trent Park, where his conversations with fellow inmates were surreptitiously recorded by the British intelligence.

Appointed commander of the 462nd Infantry Division on 8 November 1944, he led it during the Battle of Metz until his wounding in action on 22 November 1944. Made a prisoner of war when the field hospital he was in was overrun by American forces, he was held in captivity until 1947.

According to Soldaten: Secret WWII Transcripts of German POWs by Sönke Neitzel and Harald Welzer, Kittel's transcripts (in conversation with another captured general) illustrate his culpable passivity while observing mass executions of Jewish men, women and children near Daugavpils (Dvinsk) in Latvia without intervening at all despite his rank:

"Everybody. Horrible!" he exclaimed. When asked if the victims were loaded into trains, Kittel said: "If only they had been loaded into trains! The things I've experienced! In Latvia... along they came again - men, women and children - they were counted off and stripped naked; the executioners first laid all the clothes in one pile. Then 20 women had to take up their position - naked - on the edge of the trench, they were shot and fell down into it." When asked what happened to the children, Kittel said (very excitedly): "They seized three-year-old children by the hair, held them up and shot them with a pistol and then threw them in. I saw that for myself. One could watch it; the SD [Sicherheitsdienst, the Security Service of the SS] had roped the area off and the people were standing watching from about 300 m. off. The Latvians and the German soldiers were just standing there, looking on."

According to historians Neitzel and Welzer, Kittel "spoke from the perspective of an outraged observer, but as a high-ranking officer he would have had considerable opportunities to intervene in the course of events". Kittel's recorded conversations provide very clear examples of the widespread self-deception and ambivalence among German prisoners of war about the Nazi war-machine. On the one hand, his concerns about the massacres were only that they were being carried out in plain sight, and that the bodies might pollute the water supply. On the other hand, he called the perpetrators "nauseating" and said "I keep silent about a great many things; they are too awful."

== Awards and decorations ==
- Knight's Cross of the Iron Cross on 12 August 1944 as Generalmajor and combat commander of Lemberg

Military offices
Preceded by Generalleutnant Vollrath Lübbe	Commander of 462nd Volksgrenadier Division; 8 November 1944 – 22 November 1944	Succeeded by Oberst Joachim Wagner
