= Bronvaux =

- Commune
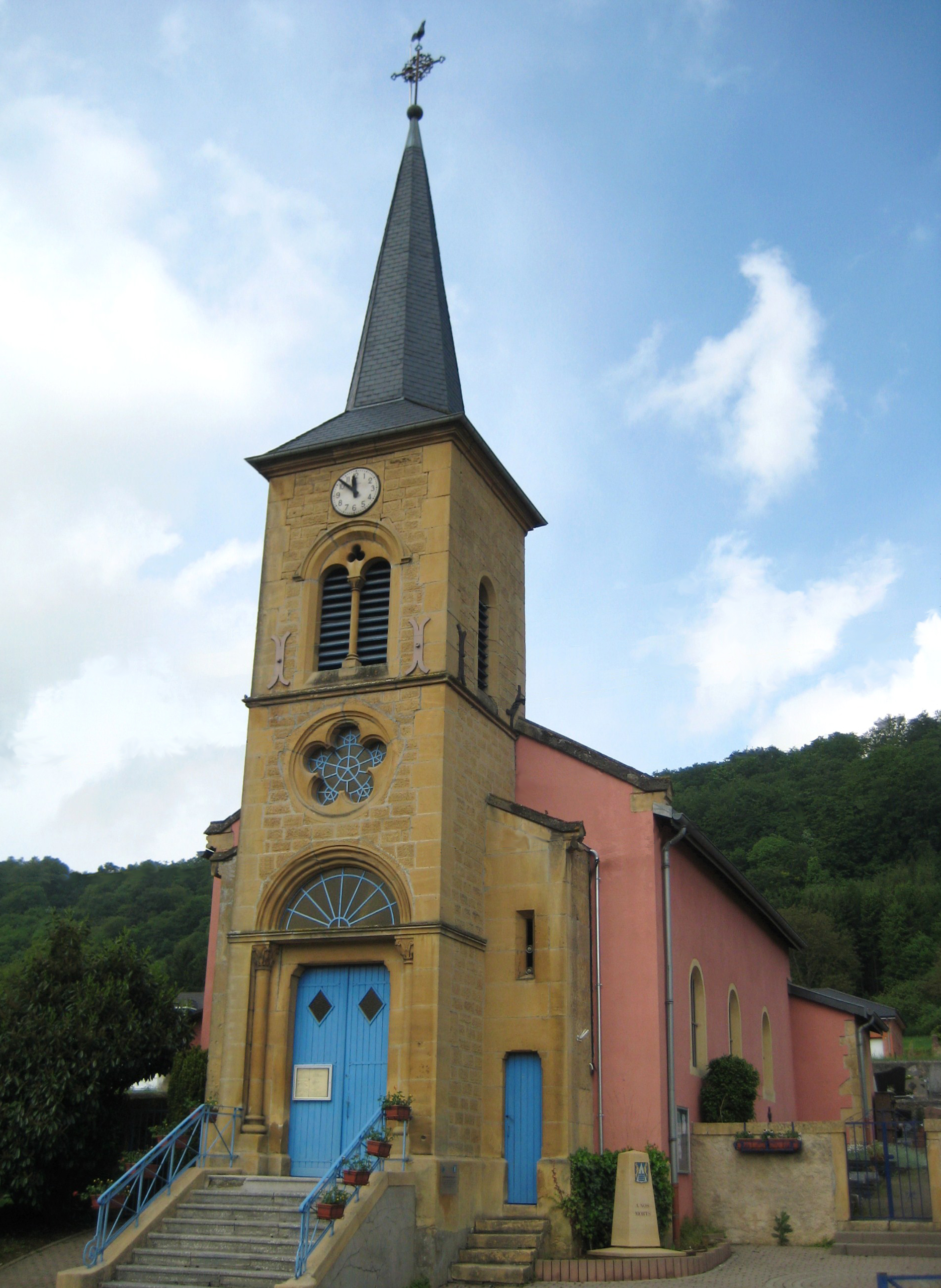
- The church in Bronvaux

- Coat of arms
- Location of Bronvaux
- Location within France Location within Grand Est
- Coordinates: 49°11′50″N 6°05′19″E
- Country: France
- Region: Grand Est
- Department: Moselle
- Arrondissement: Metz
- Canton: Rombas
- Intercommunality: Pays Orne-Moselle

Government
  - Mayor (2020–2026): Jean-Luc Favier
- Area^{1}: 1.57 km^{2} (0.61 sq mi)
- Elevation: 300 m (980 ft)
- Highest elevation: 354 m (1,161 ft)
- Lowest elevation: 215 m (705 ft)
- Population (2023): 503
  - Density: 320/km^{2} (830/sq mi)
- Time zone: UTC+01:00 (CET)
  - Summer (DST): UTC+02:00 (CEST)
- INSEE/Postal code: 57111 /57535
- ^{1} French Land Register data, which excludes lakes, ponds, glaciers > 1 km^{2} (0.386 sq mi or 247 acres) and river estuaries.

Bronvaux (French pronunciation: [bʁɔ̃vo]; German: Brunwals) is a commune in the Moselle department in Grand Est in northeastern France.

== Population ==
Historical population
Year	Pop.	±% p.a.
1968	548	—
1975	547	−0.03%
1982	562	+0.39%
1990	545	−0.38%
1999	595	+0.98%
2007	553	−0.91%
2012	549	−0.15%
2017	546	−0.11%
2023	503	−1.36%
Source: INSEE

== See also ==
- Communes of the Moselle department
