= Joachim von Siegroth =

Nazi general (1896–1945)

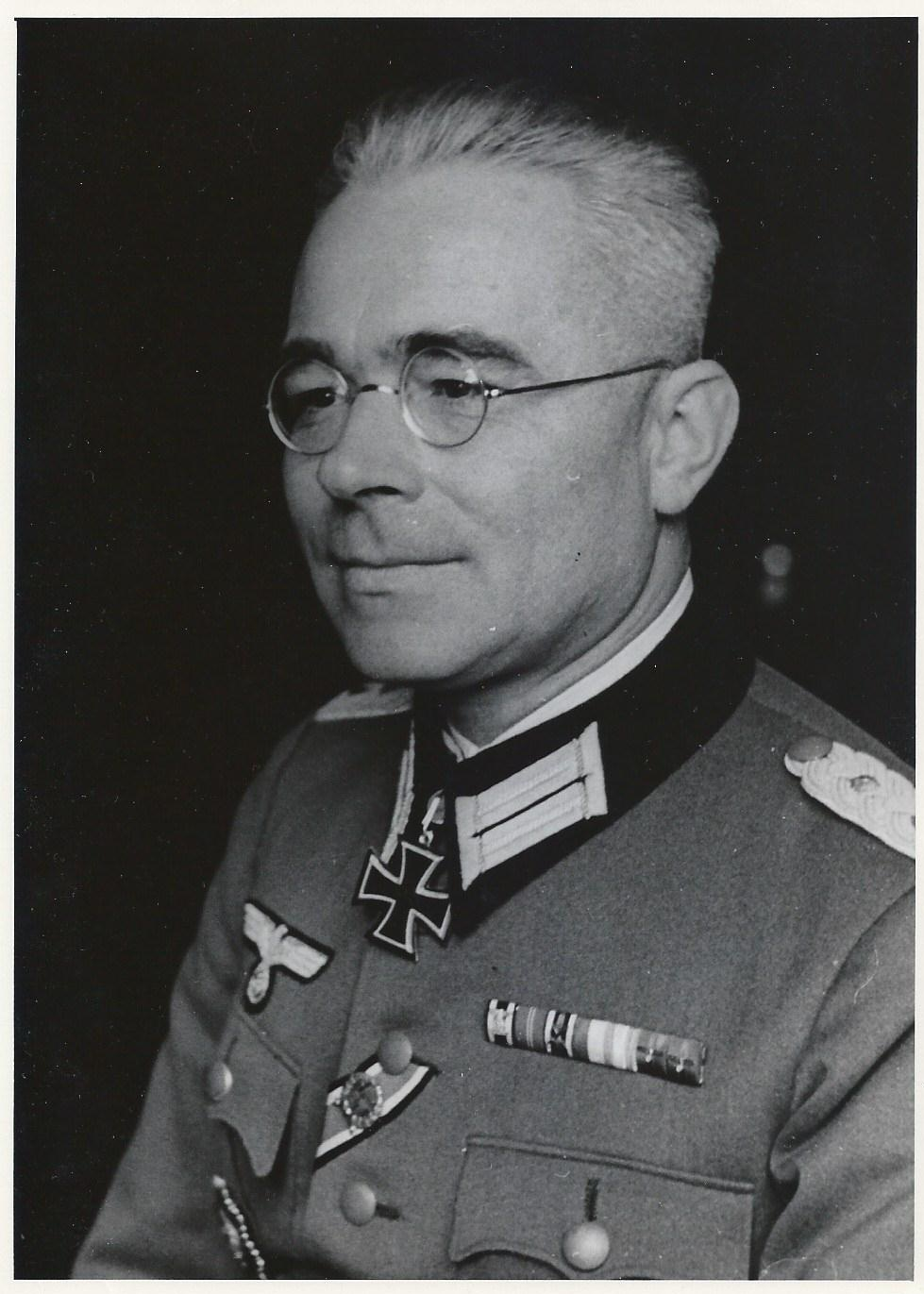
- Born: 25 December 1896
- Died: 2 May 1945 (aged 48); Missing in Action during Battle of Halbe
- Military career
- Allegiance: German Empire; Weimar Republic; Nazi Germany
- Branch: Army
- Service years: 1914–1919; 1935–1945
- Rank: Generalmajor
- Commands: 712th Infantry Division
- Conflicts: World War I World War II
- Awards: Knight's Cross of the Iron Cross
- Other work: Police officer

Joachim von Siegroth (25 December 1896 – 2 May 1945) was a Nazi general and a recipient of the Knight's Cross of the Iron Cross. Siegroth was listed as missing in action during the Battle of Halbe in May 1945.

== Awards and decorations ==
- Iron Cross (1914) 2nd Class (9 October 1914)
- Clasp to the Iron Cross (1939) 2nd Class (12 June 1940) & 1st Class (22 June 1940)
- Honour Roll Clasp of the Army (19 December 1941)
- German Cross in Gold on 19 December 1941 as Oberstleutnant in Infanterie-Regiment 255
- Knight's Cross of the Iron Cross with Oak Leaves
  - Knight's Cross on 18 October 1944 as Oberst and commander of a Kampfgruppe of the Fahnenjunker-Schule VI of the infantry Metz

Towards the end of the war, Siegroth was nominated for the Oak Leaves. The Heerespersonalamt (HPA—Army Staff Office) received the nomination for the Oak Leaves from the commander-in-chief of the 9. Armee Theodor Busse via teleprinter message on 21 April 1945 announcing that a detailed statement with explanations will follow. This nomination went to the chief of the HPA in Berlin and to the Army Group Vistula. Major Joachim Domaschk noted on 28 April: "Waiting for announced statement!" The nomination list of the higher grade of the Knight's Cross of the Iron Cross with Oak Leaves notes the entry date of 19 March 1945. This is the date when the nomination was sent. An almost unreadable comment states "Waiting". According to Fellgiebel a note claims "service proposal regarding immediate presentation pending". Scherzer does not confirm this entry but states that a comment "Waiting for announced statement" is noted instead. No further comments indicate that the nomination was further processed. According to the Association of Knight's Cross Recipients (AKCR) the award was presented in accordance with the Dönitz-decree. This is illegal according to the Deutsche Dienststelle and lacks legal justification.

== See also ==
- List of people who disappeared

Military offices
Preceded by Generalleutnant Friedrich-Wilhelm Neumann	Commander of 712. Infanterie-Division; 25 February 1945 – 2 May 1945	Succeeded by None
