= Battle of Fort Driant =

Part of the 1944 battle of Metz during WWII

- Part of the Battle of Metz, World War II
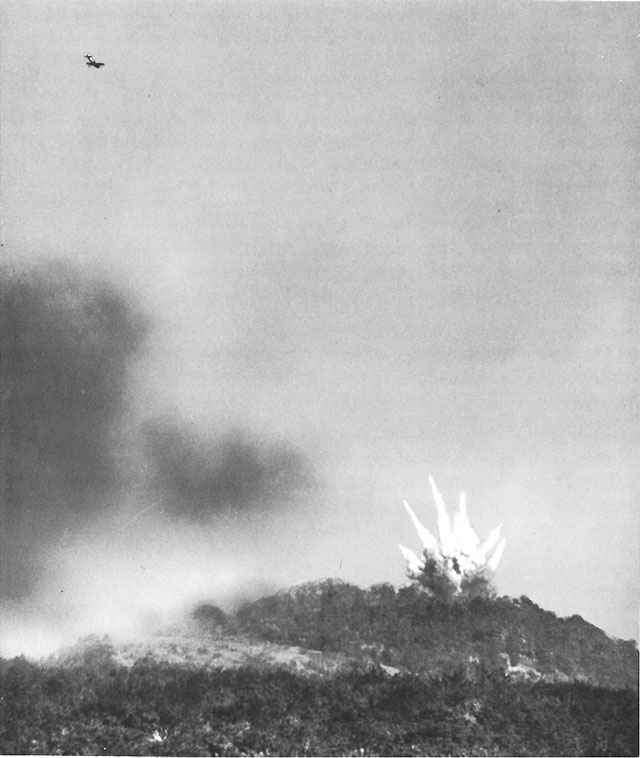
- An American P-47 Thunderbolt dive bombing Fort Driant before the initial attack
Date	27 September 1944 – 13 October 1944
Location	Southwest of Metz, Nazi Germany 49°04′22″N 6°02′49″E
Result	German victory

Belligerents
United States	Germany

Commanders and leaders
George S. Patton (Third Army); Walton Walker (XX Corps); Stafford LeRoy Irwin (5th Infantry Division)	Otto von Knobelsdorff (1st Army); Heinrich Kittel (Metz garrison)

Units involved
Third Army: XX Corps; 5th Infantry Division	1st Army

Strength
10,000	1,300–3,000

Casualties and losses
64 killed 547 wounded 187 missing or captured Total: 798	Unknown

The Battle of Fort Driant was a constituent battle in the 1944 Battle of Metz, during the Lorraine Campaign and the greater Siegfried Line Campaign. The battle was on occupied French territory between the forces of the United States Third Army under the command of General George S. Patton and the forces of Nazi Germany under General Otto von Knobelsdorff and was given the code name Operation thunderbolt.

== Location and fortifications ==
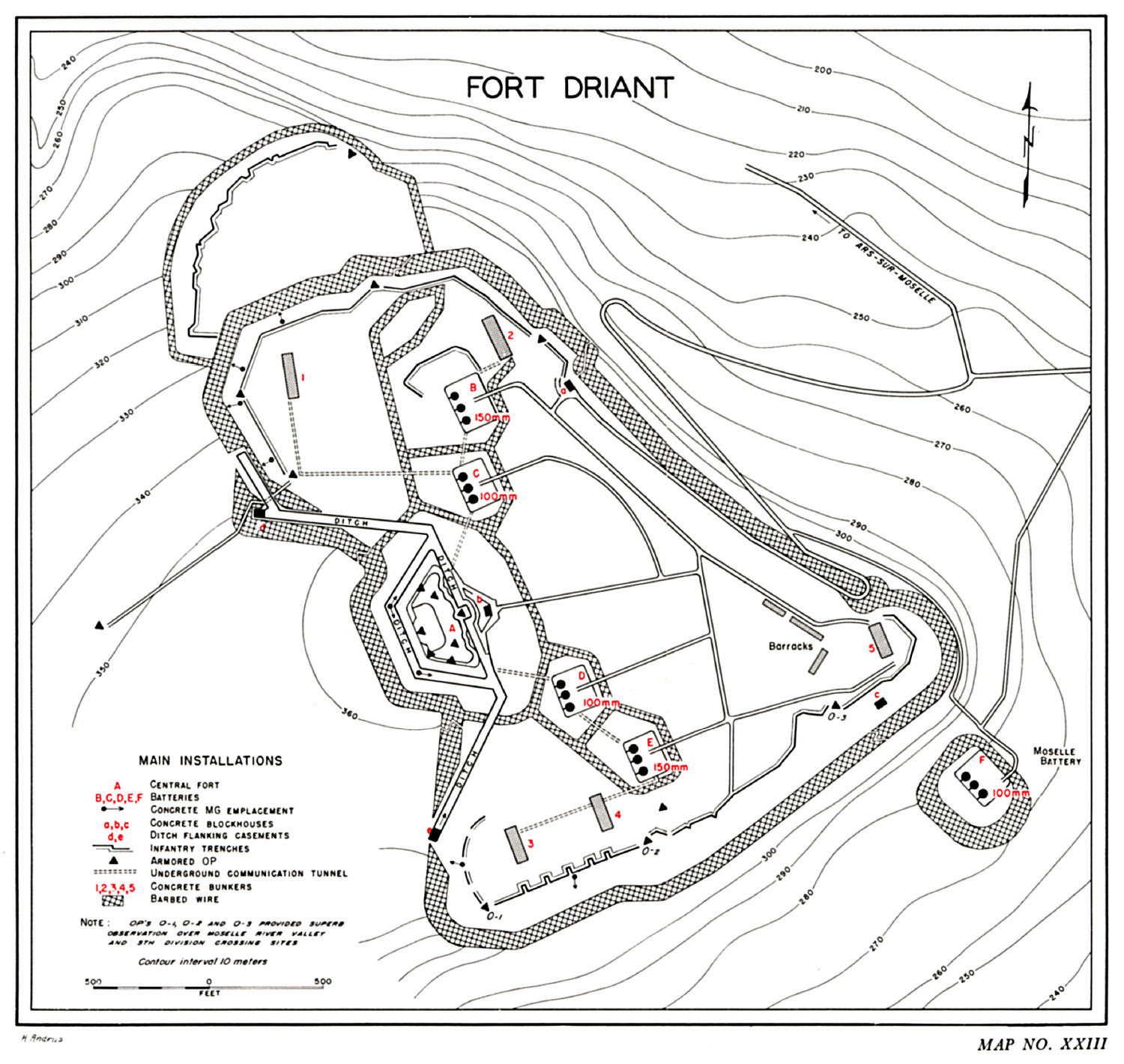
Map of the defenses of Fort Driant

Fort Driant was located 5 miles (8.0 km) southwest of Metz, just west of the Moselle River. Built in 1902 by the Germans and renamed in 1919 after Colonel Émile Driant, the fort was continually reinforced by both the French and German armies. Fort Driant was made from steel reinforced concrete; it was also surrounded by a deep dry moat and barbed wire. At the time of the battle it housed five main gun batteries of 150 mm guns, infantry trenches, and armored machine gun and observation posts. From its commanding position, it could direct heavy fire in the Moselle Valley. The fort could also rain flanking fire that produced heavy casualties amongst the men of General Walton Walker's XX Corps.

== Background ==
Third Army's intelligence section had already determined that the Germans intended to make the most of the ring of forts around Metz, the ancient gateway city through which so many invading armies had passed. Metz was to be the linchpin in the Germans' defensive strategy. An army had not directly taken the city since 1552. It had been captured after a 54-day siege during the Franco-Prussian War and had been fortified by the Germans in World War I. However, the string of fortresses were left in ruins.

Attacks began on 15 September 1944 when the XIX Tactical Air Command (TAC) bombed the fort, scoring several direct hits with 1,000-pound bombs, with little effect. Several 240 mm artillery pieces then fired on Fort Driant, with similar results.

When the U.S. Third Army arrived at Metz, they were quickly drawn into a stalemate with the German defenders for weeks over control of the city and its perimeter. On September 27, the failure of a regimental effort by 90th Infantry Division against Fort Jeanne d'Arc indicated to Third Army the inherent strength of the various fortified positions blocking entry into Metz. Upon sustaining heavy losses attacking the fortifications, it was clear to the Americans that Fort Driant would have to be taken to establish effective control of the fortifications around the city.

On 27 September, Patton committed elements of the 5th Infantry Division to a probing assault against Driant.

== Battle ==
At 14:15 on September 27, 1944 P-47 Thunderbolts equipped with thousand-pound bombs and napalm from the XIX Tactical Air Command began bombing Fort Driant. Companies E and B of the 11th Infantry Regiment, and the attached Company C, 818th Tank Destroyer Battalion began their attack on Fort Driant. Small arms fire, machine guns and mortars immediately began firing upon the advancing troops. Most of the fort was below ground, causing the tank destroyers to be ineffective against the heavily armored pillboxes. After the initial attack faltered, the Americans withdrew to the original position at 18:30 The attack resumed on the 29th with bulldozers to fill in the fort's trench line and the support of Company C, 735th Tank Battalion, pushing explosive-filled pipes called "snakes" in front of their tanks. The bulldozers and snakes proved to be of little help as during the second attack the bulldozers experienced mechanical difficulties and the snakes were either damaged (bent) or would not work as intended. Despite the failed attempt to breach the perimeter, General Irwin ordered the attack to commence on schedule at 12:00.

Upon reaching the perimeter, the German defenders were ready. B Company, 11th Infantry Regiment managed to breach the wire in the southwestern corner of the complex, owing to the attached tanks leading the assault. B Company blew past pillboxes to be mopped up later on the way to its initial objective, and, under the cover of the tanks, their engineers attempted to blast their way into the two concrete barracks buildings, barracks 3 and 4. By 14:00, B Company was on its objective, attempting to destroy the barracks. Fierce hand-to-hand fighting with grenades and bayonets broke out between the two sides. E Company, under heavy fire and with its bulldozer-equipped tanks non-functioning, failed to breach the perimeter and dug in outside the wire for four days, losing 35 out of its 140 personnel.

The commander of B Company, a Captain Anderson, discovered after repeatedly throwing grenades into a bunker that its occupants had withdrawn to the main fort through an underground tunnel. Anderson then used a phosphorus grenade and two fragmentation grenades to assault a concrete structure, prompting its occupants to emerge and surrender. One of the surrendering German troops was identified as a member of the Officer Candidate Regiment that most of the fort's defenders belonged to. Growing desperate to keep the attack's momentum, a self-propelled gun was brought to the front and fired at the barracks from a mere 30 yards (27 m) away, to no avail. By then, neighboring forts had begun to bombard the attackers, and artillery fire from batteries hidden in the surrounding forest caused the attackers' casualties to mount. Their momentum was regained as a Private Holmlund from B Company climbed on top of barracks 3 to find several ventilator shafts. Kicking off the shafts' covers, he began shoving bangalore torpedoes into them, forcing its occupants to flee via underground tunnel to barracks 4. In response, the defenders leveled their guns at the roof of barracks 4 to prevent it from being destroyed in the same manner as barracks 3. However, one of the self-propelled guns managed to blast in the door to barracks 4 at close range, allowing the four surviving members of the platoon to enter and begin clearing the bunker. B Company established its command post in the remains of barracks 3, inside of a perimeter of tanks and infantry.

At 17:00, G Company, 11th Infantry, which was previously being held in reserve, was ordered to destroy the two northern artillery batteries. Due to low visibility and continued small-arms fire by the defenders, G Company failed to reach its objective. During the night, the Germans were likely reinforced, as they still held the Mance ravine and the road from Ars-sur-Moselle. G Company, stumbling through the maze of pillboxes in search of its objective, trenches, and tunnels, was almost routed by German counterattacks during the night, before being reinforced by K Company of the 2nd Infantry Regiment. Facing mounting casualties, the 11th Infantry was ordered to continue the attack. Patton refused to accept that the attack might stall and was quoted as saying "if it took every man in the XX Corps, [he] could not allow an attack by this Army to fail." As the second day of the attack began, B and E Companies of the 11th Infantry has suffered 110 casualties, or about 50%. The only objectives that had been achieved were not vital to the capture of the fort.

During the following days, further attempts were made to enter the artillery batteries and main barracks, but none were successful. In the daytime, German artillery fire from all surrounding areas focused on defending the fort and it became impossible to sustain the attackers who were already narrowly hanging on to the positions they had seized. The attackers only resort was to transport supplies in the tanks allocated to the attached artillery forward observers. During the night time, the artillery barrages ceased and German troops emerged from the maze of concrete tunnels and viciously counterattacked the Americans' toehold on the fort, and completely isolating the attackers from any support. On October 5, the commanding officer of G Company sent a desperate message to the Battalion Commander detailing the dire state of the attack; the Company Commander was revered in the battalion as a gallant and competent leader, and his message was not disregarded. Given the desperate reports from the front and mounting casualties, 5th Infantry Division commander Major General S. Leroy Irwin decided that a task force of fresh troops commanded by the Assistant Division Commander would need to be brought in by 1st Battalion, 10th Infantry Regiment, 3rd Battalion, 2nd Infantry, as well as the entire 7th Combat Engineer Battalion to relieve the battered 2nd Battalion of the 11th Infantry. It was decided that the attack would restart on 7 October.

Preliminary bombardment of the fort by US 240 mm and 8-inch howitzers, the largest guns in US Army inventory, failed to yield any effects on the German artillery batteries in the fort. The artillery batteries were covered with steel domes, with only the end of the breach visible, and were found to be impervious to indirect fire. In response, US 155 mm self-propelled howitzers would engage in direct-fire skirmishes with the batteries, and through quick and accurate direct fire force the batteries to retract into safer non-firing positions. None of these fortified batteries were destroyed by these engagements, but they were effectively suppressed completely using this method.

The task force commander received a set of detailed plans of the fort, and decided the attack should consist of a subterranean assault on a tunnel that connected the barracks held by US troops to the main barracks by way of the artillery batteries, with an attack on the surface to prevent the defenders from focusing their efforts on preventing the underground assault. The combined efforts of 1st Battalion, 10th Infantry and 3rd Battalion, 2nd Infantry, managed to retake most of the southern area of the fort, but lost two platoons, and the commander of B Company of the 1st Battalion, 10th Infantry was captured along with two forward observers. After this, no further meaningful gains were made on the surface. The subterranean attack continued although the attached French advisor who was the expert on the fort advised against it. An iron door blocked C Company, 10th Infantry's way into the 3 feet (0.91 m) wide, 7 feet (2.1 m) high tunnel. After the engineers successfully blew a hole in it, it was discovered that the door was backed by more than 20 feet (6.1 m) of scrap metal, concrete, and wrecked equipment, which had been stacked to the ceiling. Welding equipment was brought into the tunnel to cut away the debris, which was finally removed by the morning of 8 October, revealing another iron door which was believed to be the last barrier blocking the tunnel. The presence of fumes created by the constant welding and detonation of charges forced the besiegers to constantly evacuate the tunnel, and the use of ventilators and the construction of ventilation shafts proved ineffective. Due to the constant sound of digging on the German side of the tunnel, the Americans feared they would be counter-charged, and placed a 60-pound beehive charge against the door. Its detonation required the tunnel to be evacuated for two hours to allow the intense carbide fumes to subside as fumes wafted back into the barracks where the US wounded were being tended to, and men rushed to gulp air through rifle slits in the barracks above, with some even running into the open where artillery shells exploded all around. Finally, an engineer officer crawled back into the tunnel to discover only a small hole had been opened by the charge. Before more explosives could be brought in, the Germans opened fire along the tunnel, forcing the Americans to build a sandbag parapet with a machinegun mounted on it. On the surface, another futile attack was launched on the southern artillery batteries, but the bloodied attackers were still beaten back by swarms of German infantry emerging at night. Between October 3 and 8, 21 officers and 485 American troops were killed, wounded, or went missing.

On the morning of October 9, Patton convened a meeting with Generals Irwin, Walker, and Warnock, sending General Gay to represent himself. Warnock suggested surrounding the fort and attacking it via tunnels, but Gay declined as the XX Corps lacked the manpower to do so. The men of the 5th Infantry Division were thought to be becoming battle fatigued, and other line connecting operations were taking place around Metz with much greater success. With Patton's agreement, Gay gave the order to abandon the attack on Fort Driant. At approximately 16:50, a massive explosion ripped through the tunnel, killing four and almost fatally gassing another 23 US troops. It was unknown if the explosion was an accident or intentionally caused by the Germans. The stalemate continued for another three days, until the night of October 12. The evacuation proceeded with almost no intervention by the Germans. Six tanks were abandoned to be destroyed by American artillery. Engineer detachments with the rear guard placed over 6,000 combined pounds of explosives on any concrete fortifications they could find. The last troops left the fort at 23:30, and the last explosions detonated on the inside of the fort around an hour later.

The Germans lost roughly a quarter of the fort before the Americans withdrew having lost 734 troops.

== Aftermath ==
Irwin was blamed by some for the failure at Fort Driant, for "moving too slow" and "removing the drive" of the battalion early during the initial attacks in September. However, on September 28, Patton had in fact instructed Irwin to use the lull in the fighting to recuperate losses in his regiments. Walker suggested that a lack of aggressive leadership at the battalion and regimental levels led the attack to stall, to which Irwin pointed out that up until the attack had commenced, the fortifications at Fort Driant had never been observed from the ground, and the attack's planners weren't aware of the fort's pillbox fortifications and layered barbed wire surrounding the perimeter. When Metz fell in December 1944, Fort Driant surrendered to the 5th Infantry Division at 15:45 on December 8. It was discovered among the prisoners that there were several units of the 17th SS Panzer Grenadier Division, along with the remnants of the German 1217th Grenadier Regiment and the III. Battalion of the Officer Training Regiment, which may have contributed to the Germans' stiff resistance.

General Omar Bradley, commander of the Twelfth Army Group and Patton's immediate superior, recorded the following exchange with Patton where he expressed his frustration with Patton's initial refusal to bypass the fort: "During October, he [Patton] undertook an unauthorized pecking campaign against the enemy fortress position at Metz. When I found him probing those battlements, I appealed impatiently to him. 'For God's sake, George, lay off,' I said, 'I promise you'll get your chance. When we get going again you can far more easily pinch out Metz and take it from behind. Why bloody your nose in this pecking campaign?" Patton replied "We're using Metz to blood the new divisions." Bradley remarked on this exchange "Though I was nettled over George's persistence in these forays at Metz, I declined to make an issue of it." Patton's comment referenced the 5th Infantry Division being saturated with new troops, as it had suffered heavy casualties at Dornot in September, with some battalions almost entirely destroyed.
