= Fort Jeanne d'Arc =

Fortification in Moselle, France

- Part of Metz festen/Fortifications of Metz
- Metz, France

Site information
- Type: Fort, Moselstellung
- Owner: French Ministry of Defense
- Controlled by: France
- Open to the public: No
- Condition: Abandoned

Location
- Coordinates: 49.1168°N 6.06701°E

Site history
- Built: 1899
- Materials: Stone, concrete
- Battles/wars: Battle of Metz

Fort Jeanne d'Arc, also called Fortified Group Jeanne d'Arc, is a fortification located to the west of Metz in the Moselle department of France. It was built by Germany to the west of the town of Rozérieulles in the early 20th century as part of the third and final group of Metz fortifications. The fortification program was started after the German victory of the Franco-Prussian War, which resulted in the annexation of the provinces of Alsace and Lorraine from France to Germany. The Fort Jeanne d'Arc was part of the Moselstellung, a group of eleven fortresses surrounding Thionville and Metz to guard against the possibility of a French attack aimed at regaining Alsace and Lorraine, with construction taking place between 1899 and 1908. The fortification system incorporated new principles of defensive construction to deal with advances in artillery. Later forts, such as Jeanne d'Arc, embodied innovative design concepts such as dispersal and concealment. These later forts were designed to support offensive operations, as an anchor for a pivoting move by German forces into France.

The Feste Kaiserin, as Fort Jeanne d'Arc was called by the Germans, with seven other Metz forts, assured the protection of Metz against French attack. It is one of the largest of the Metz forts. Positioned to the rear of the principal lines of combat in the First World War, the fort never saw combat in that war, but was captured by advancing American forces in the Lorraine Campaign of World War II after resisting for nearly a month.

== Design and operational concept ==
Metz is surrounded by two rings of fortifications in addition to the medieval and Vauban-era fortifications of the central city. The inner ring of eleven forts was built in a manner similar to the French Séré de Rivières system forts, as a defined, walled and ditched perimeter with a concentration of artillery positions. The later positions, including Jeanne d'Arc, did not have walled perimeters. The infantry positions, fortified barracks and artillery batteries were dispersed and concealed in natural and constructed topography.

From 1899, the Germans viewed Metz and Thionville as a secure position that could provide an anchor for a pivoting movement into France from the Low Countries. This strategy, which would become known as the Schlieffen Plan, required that the Moselstellung deter an advance by French forces into Lorraine while the German forces mobilized.

== Description ==
Fort Jeanne d'Arc is located about 8 kilometres (5.0 mi) to the west of Metz. It was designed for a garrison of 1900 men and armed with six 100mm guns in two batteries, six 150mm howitzers in two batteries and four 77mm guns in casemates. Four separate fortified barracks housed troops, with underground galleries connecting the battery, barracks, and infantry positions. In addition, four bastion-like points on the north, south, east and west housed infantry strongpoints. Barbed wire entanglements were swept by 77mm guns firing from bastions or counterscarp positions. The east and west strongpoints were separately enclosed with barbed wire entanglements and had their own barracks, while the west point additionally had an earthwork rampart with a caponier. A total of seven reinforced barracks had a capacity of 2580 troops.

The fortified barracks were built into a hillside so that their rears are shielded by earth, while the tops and fronts are protected by three or four metres of concrete, and are surmounted by parapets. The batteries are similarly constructed and linked to the barracks by tunnels at an average depth of 8 metres (26 ft) to 11 metres (36 ft) metres, extending over 2,350 metres (7,710 ft). The whole was surrounded by deep networks of barbed wire, which were swept by fire from small perimeter blockhouses, also linked via the tunnel system. The interior of the position was equipped with trenches for infantry. The barracks and batteries were further armoured with reinforced concrete and armored windows. A variety of blockhouses and infantry shelters were also built in the intervals between forts. The fort's surface extends over 121 hectares (300 acres)

The dispersed, un-walled nature of the later Moselstellung was a significant innovation. Compared to the French Séré de Rivières system forts of the same era, German fortifications were scattered over a large area and enclosed chiefly by barbed wire. While certain individual elements presented imposing walls to an attacker, these walls were not continuous. The dispersed nature is evidenced by the official French name: the Groupe Fortifié Jeanne d'Arc (Fortified Group of Jeanne d'Arc). These arrangements were studied and improved upon by the French in the construction of the Maginot Line.

== History ==
Begun in 1899, Jeanne d'Arc was completed in 1908 and saw no action during World War I, as Metz remained well within German lines for the duration of the war. The fort was initially named Feste Point du Jour, but was renamed Feste Kaiserin on 12 May 1900. The fort was reinforced with concrete over the original stonework between 1912 and 1914. Some of the original yellow stone remains visible on the face of the barracks, ornamented with elaborate reliefs. With the Armistice of 1918, Lorraine was returned to France and the fort became French property.

The Metz fortifications contributed some of their long 100mm guns to replace the short 100mm guns at Thionville when France upgraded the Thionville sector to back up the Maginot Line fortifications in the area. Fort Jeanne d'Arc was the headquarters for the French 3rd Army in 1940. During the Battle of France the Metz area was bypassed and encircled by German forces, with the Maginot and earlier fortifications seeing little action before the Armistice of 1940.

In September 1944, the U.S. 5th and 90th Infantry Divisions of the U.S. Third Army, approached Metz from the west. They encountered the western arc of Metz defenses, including Fort Jeanne d'Arc and its neighbors Fort Driant to the south and Fort François de Guise to the north. The defenses of Metz were manned by the 462nd Volksgrenadier Division, attached to the German First Army, Army Group G. A total of about 9,000 to 10,000 combat-ready troops occupied Metz.

The combined fire of the forts stopped the American advance once initial contact had been made. An attack on Fort Driant beginning on 27 September was finally called off on 9 October after heavy U.S. casualties. After this check, a more patient strategy of encirclement and investment was pursued. achieving success with the capture of the Fort de Koenigsmacker at Thionville on 12 November. In mid-November a renewed attack was launched by XII and XX Corps to envelop and eventually bypass Metz. The U.S. 95th Infantry Division was stationed immediately to the west of Metz, in the vicinity of Fort Jeanne d'Arc, and maintained contact while the 5th Infantry and other U.S. formations moved to the north and south. An assault was opened by the 95th Infantry on 14 November, concentrating on the interval between Fort Jeanne d'Arc and Fort François de Guise, which was occupied by a chain of smaller fortifications known as the "Seven Dwarves." American forces were able to penetrate to the Moselle by 18 November, leaving a force behind to contain the forts. In the meantime, the surviving remnants of the 462nd Volksgrenadier consolidated a defense at Fort Jeanne d'Arc. At the end of November, three forts were holding out and surrounded by the U.S. 2nd Infantry Division. The Metz forts were gradually reduced through December. Fort Jeanne d'Arc was the last to surrender on 13 December 1944, capitulating to the U.S. III Corps.

=== NATO air defense center ===
Following the war, Fort Jeanne d'Arc was selected to become a NATO control center for air defense operations, manned by American, Canadian and French personnel. The site was designated the Moselle Common Area Control (MCAC), and provided air traffic control for a portion of Northeastern France and adjoining areas of Luxembourg and West Germany, along with approach control for four USAF bases as well as a flight plan service for RCAF Station Grostenquin. The facility occupied casernes 3 and 4, with the interior of Caserne 4 renovated to provide a two-level operations room. Work was largely financed by Canada, with a French contribution of 73 million francs. After France's withdrawal from the NATO integrated command structure in 1967, the center was operated solely by the French, finally abandoned in the late 1990s. A similar facility, known for a time as Ouvrage F, operated at the nearby Fort François de Guise, while another existed at Fort Marne.

== Present status ==
The fort remains the property of the Ministry of Defense and is not accessible to the public.

== See also ==
- Fortifications of Metz
