= Forts of Metz =

Fortified belts around Metz, Lorraine, France

The forts of Metz are two fortified belts around the city of Metz in Lorraine. (Note: Not to be confused with the French works in the Région fortifiée de Metz from the later ligne Maginot.) Built according to the design and theory of Raymond Adolphe Séré de Rivières at the end of the Second Empire—and later Hans von Biehler while Metz was under German control—they earned the city the reputation of premier stronghold of the German Reich. These fortifications were particularly thorough given the city's strategic position between France and Germany. The detached forts and fortified groups of the Metz area were spared in World War I, but showed their full defensive potential in the Battle of Metz at the end of World War II.

== Context ==
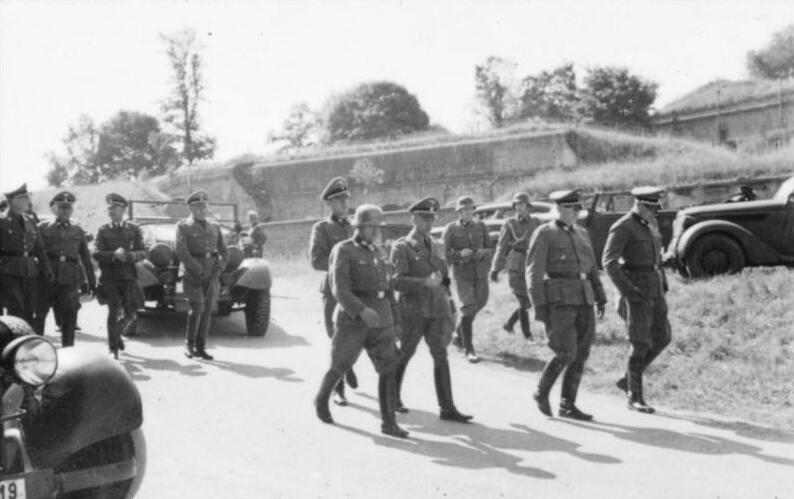
Fort de Plappeville : inspection by Himmler and Sepp Dietrich on 7 September 1940.

Before the invention of rifled artillery, the place de Metz was considered untakeable. In the 19th century, improvements in artillery forced French engineers to conceive a new defensive system around the stronghold of Metz, the first fortified belt. For this work marshal Adolphe Niel allocated a sum of twelve million gold francs, used for four detached advance forts, Saint-Quentin and Plappeville to the west, and the Fort de Saint-Julien and Fort de Queuleu to the east. This measure, conceived by colonel Séré de Rivières, was incomplete when war broke out in 1870.

After the Treaty of Frankfurt, the defenses of Metz were completed by German military engineers, who added seven more forts between 1871 et 1898. These forts, designed by Hans von Biehler, made up the first fortified belt of Metz. The purpose of this first belt was to hold attackers at a distance and keep them away, thus protecting the city from direct enemy fire. The forts could also assist troop maneuvers outside the fort by providing supporting fire.

Because of advances in artillery technology, between 1899 and 1916 the first belt was reinforced by a second, composed of nine fortification groups. Based on new concepts of defense, such as dispersion and dissimulation, the fortification groups were intended to constitute an uncrossable barrier to any attacking French forces. The fortifications of Metz were part of a larger program of fortifications called Moselstellung which fortresses scattered between, Thionville et Metz in the Moselle valley. The German objective was on the one hand to protect against a French attempt to retake Alsace-Lorraine from the German Empire, and on the other to form an advance post in French defenses capable of serving as a rear base to a German offensive.

For this major strategic point in the empire's defenses, (Note: Terminus of Kanonenbahn Berlin - Metz, a strategic railway line.) the German command kept work going on the fortifications until World War I. Emperor Wilhelm II, who regularly came to Metz to inspect the construction, said on this subject:

"Metz and its army corps constitute a cornerstone of the military might of Germany, destined to protect the peace of Germany, even of all of Europe, a peace I have the firm will to safeguard."

Within its walls Metz was then a vibrant German garrison town manned with Bavarians in cloth caps, Prussians and Saxons in pointed helmets and dark green uniforms, and Hessians in light green uniforms. The German garrison oscillated between 15,000 and 20,000 at the beginning of the period and reached 25,000 before the First World War. Many German officers belonging to the Prussian military aristocracy settled in Metz with their families, which explains the more than forty German generals born in Metz. Rotations brought some of the most famous names of the German army there, such as Goring, Ribbentrop or Guderian, and gave the German high command the conviction that this stronghold, thought to be untakeable, was unquestionably German. At the onset of World War I Metz was considered one of the most formidable strongholds in the world. Paradoxically, the city was spared from combat.

These fortifications proved their defensive capabilities at the end of the Second World War. During the Battle of Metz the forts de Metz, despite the ravages of time, despite undermanning and a definite lack of weaponry, shielding and optical equipment, blocked a powerful army, much superior to the French Army of 1914.

== Concept ==
The forts are generally composed of one or more casernes fortes (fortified barracks), surrounded by smaller blockhauses. Buried underground on three sides, they faced away from enemy fire and offered nothing to catch the eye beyond the façade, of dressed stone on the oldest forts, concrete on the newer. They generally had walls more than two meters thick covered with several meters of rammed-earth, after 1900 often reinforced by an additional one to two meters of concrete. Tunnels often link the structures to one another. The oldest forts are surrounded by large ditches, actually dry moats, whose depths reached a dozen meters deep in places. After 1914 these forts were often surrounded by a dense network of barbed wire and anti-tank spikes.

=== Forts of the first belt ===
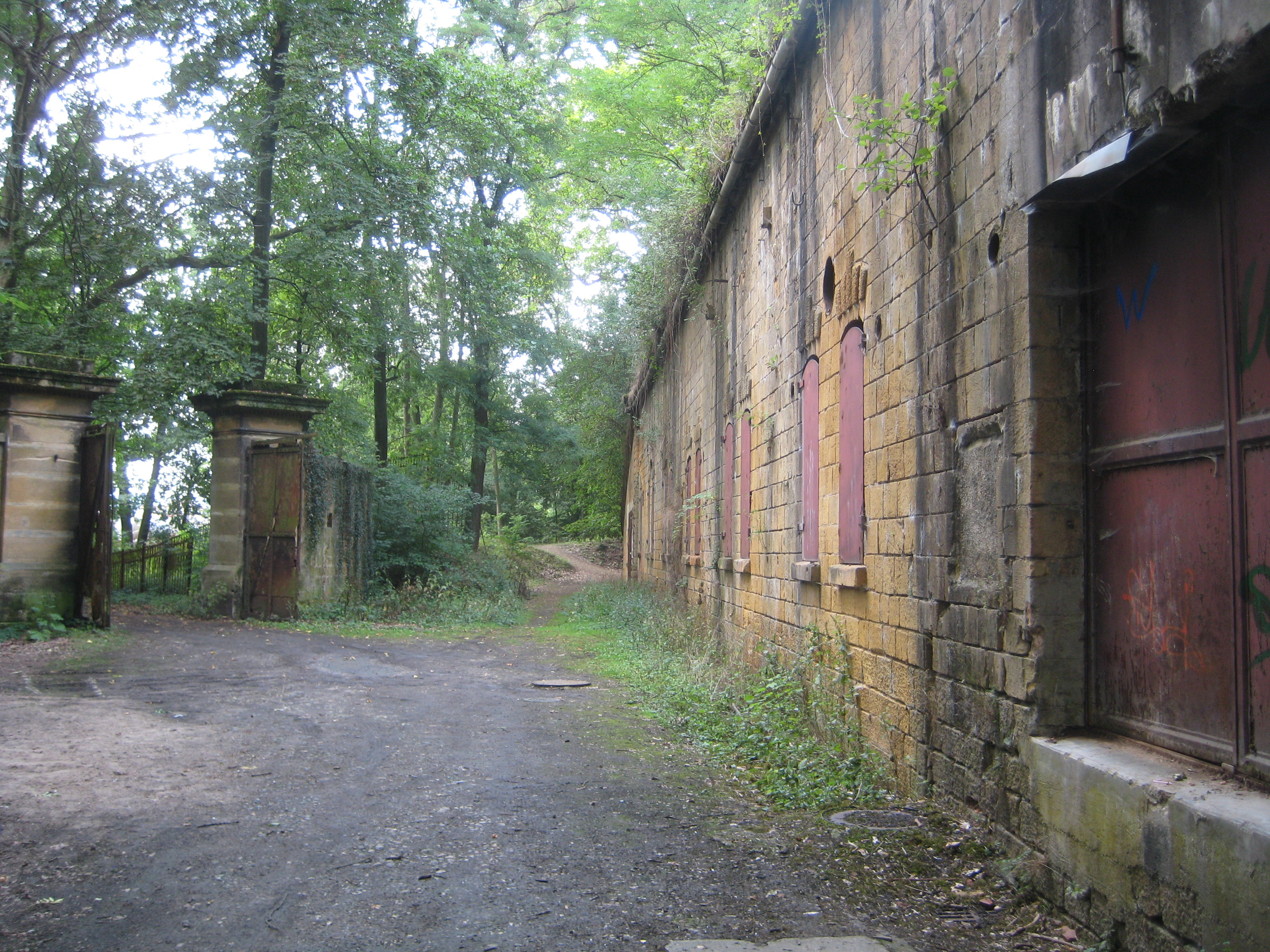
Fort Gambetta (fort Hindersin), 1879–1881.

- Fort Saint-Privat (1870) / Fort Prinz August von Württemberg (1872–1875)
- Fort de Queuleu (1867–1870) / Fort Goeben (1871–1890): southeast
- Fort des Bordes (1870) / Fort von Zastrow (1874–1875): east, completely underground between the neighborhoods of Borny and Vallières-Les Bordes
- Fort de Saint-Julien (1867–1870) / Fort Manteuffel (1871–1891)
- Fort Gambetta / Fort Hindersin (1879–1881)
- Fort Déroulède / Fort Kameke (1876–1879)
- Fort Decaen / Fort Schwerin (1878–1880)
- Fort de Plappeville (1867–1870) / Fort Alvensleben (1871–1891): southeast
- Groupe fortifié du Saint-Quentin (1867–1870) / Feste Prinz Friedrich-Karl (1872–1892)
  - Fort Diou (1867–1870) / Ostfort (1872–1892)
  - Fort Girardin / Fort Mannstein (1872–1892)

=== Forts of the second belt ===
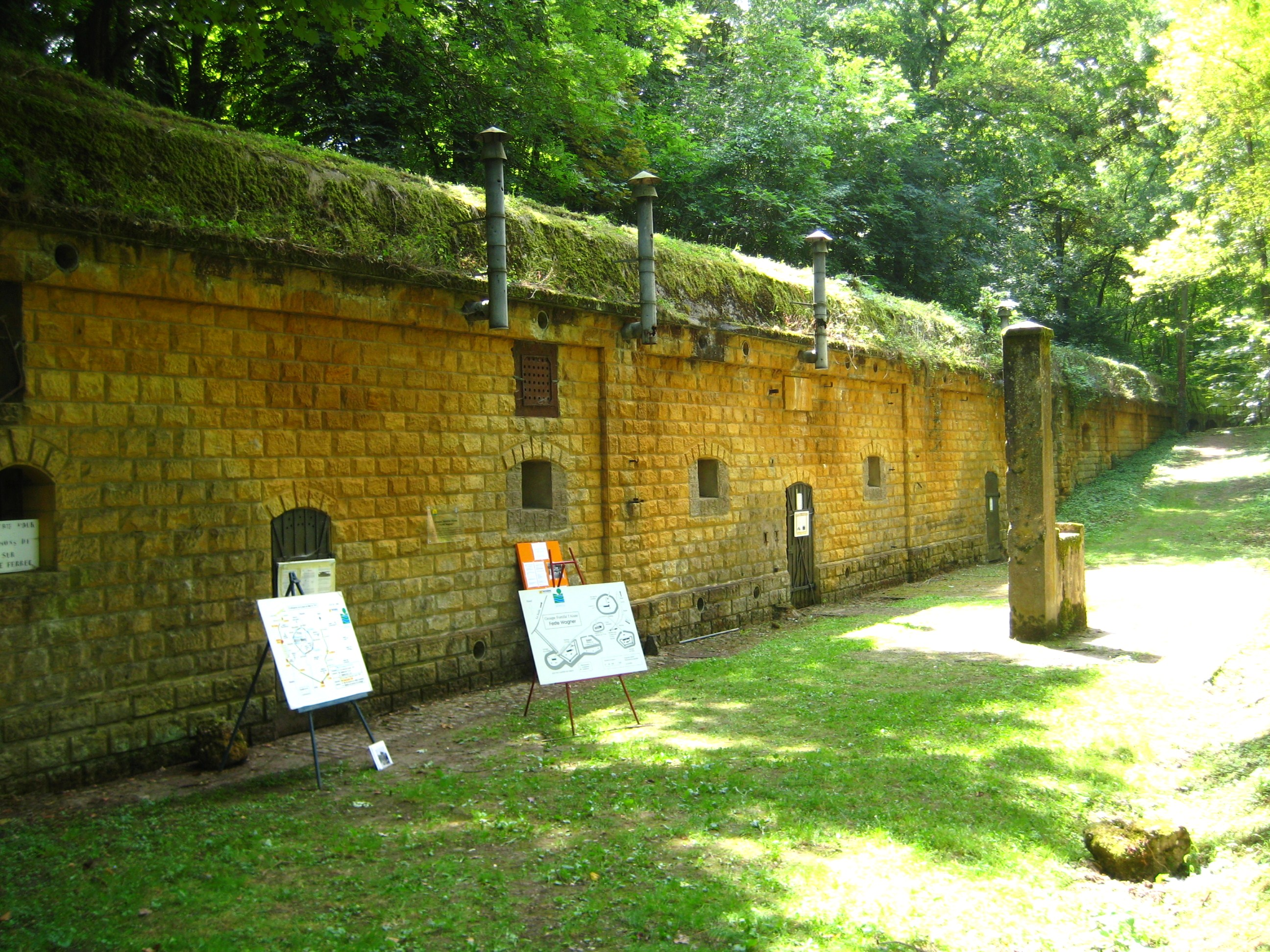
L’Aisne fortifications (Feste Wagner), 1904-1912

- Group fortifications
- de l’Aisne / Feste Wagner (1904–1912)
- Driant / Feste Kronprinz (1899–1905)
- François de Guise / Feste Leipzig (1907–1912)
- Jeanne-d’Arc / Feste Kaiserin (1899–1905)
- Lorraine / Feste Lothringen (1899–1905)
- La Marne/ Feste Freiherr von der Goltz (1907–1916)
- Verdun / Feste Graf Haeseler (1899–1905)
- L'Yser / Feste Prinz Regent Luitpold (1907–1914)
- Malroy (projet planned but not built)

=== Infantry works ===
Starting in 1905, no less than eleven secondary works were added to reinforce the defenses northwest of Metz:

*Sainte-Anne Wolfsberg (Kellermann) Moscou, Leipzig, Saint-Vincent were built between the groupes fortifiés Lothringen et Kaiserin. In front of Feste Lothringen, several other infantry works were built:

de Fèves, d’Horimont I, II, III (Canrobert), d’Amanvillers and de Vémont (Richepance). All these works have infantry casemates, and were surrounded by ditchwork and barbed wire.

To the southwest, the anticipated direction of French attack, no less than seven secondary works were built between 1912 and 1916, between the Feste Kaiserin et Kronprinz. Because of their vulnerability compared to the fortified groups of the second belt, these works were nicknamedThe Seven Dwarves by the GIs of the 3rd Army, during the battle of Metz in September to December 1944.

- Ouvrage d'infanterie de Fèves / Infanterie-Werk Fèves northeast of Metz.
- Ouvrage d'infanterie Champagne / Infanterie-Werk Mey (1907–1912) east of Forts Saint-Julien and des Bordes.
- Ouvrage d’infanterie Lauvallière / Infanterie-Werk Belle-Croix (1908–1914) à l’est des forts Saint-Julien et Des Bordes.
- Ouvrage d'infanterie de Chesny-nord / Infanterie-Werk Chesny (1907–1911), between the forts de la Marne et de l’Yser.
- Chesny-sud / Infanterie-Werk Chesny (1907–1911) between the forts de la Marne et de l’Yser.
- Bois-la-Dame / Infanterie-Werk Bois-la-Dame (1913–1916), entre Driant et Jeanne-d’Arc (Seven Dwarfs).
- Marival / Infanterie-Werk Marival (1912–1916), entre Driant et Jeanne-d’Arc ( Seven Dwarfs ).
- Point d’appui Vaux Sud (1912–1916), entre Driant et Jeanne-d’Arc ( Seven Dwarfs ).
- Point d’appui Vaux Nord (1912–1916), entre Driant et Jeanne-d’Arc ( Seven Dwarfs ).
- Point d’appui Jussy Sud (1912–1916), entre Driant et Jeanne-d’Arc ( Seven Dwarfs ).
- Point d’appui Jussy Nord (1912–1916), entre Driant et Jeanne-d’Arc ( Seven Dwarfs ).
- Point d’appui Saint-Hubert (1912–1916), entre Driant et Jeanne-d’Arc ( Seven Dwarfs ).
- Point d’appui Kellermann / Wolfsberg-Stellung (1904–1906), east of groupe fortifié Lorraine.
- Point d’appui des Carrières d’Amanvillers / Steinbruch-Stellung (1912–1916), northwest of groupe fortifié Lorraine.
- Point d’appui Canrobert / Horimont-Stellung (1912–1916), au nord du groupe fortifié Lorraine.
- Point d’appui Richepance / Batterie Vemont, au nord du groupe fortifié Lorraine.
- Point d’appui de Moscou, between the groupes fortifiés Lorraine et Jeanne-d’Arc.
- Point d’appui St-Vincent, between the groupes fortifiés Lorraine et Jeanne-d’Arc.
- Point d’appui Leipzig, between the groupes fortifiés Lorraine et Jeanne-d’Arc.

=== Artillery works ===
Batteries of cannons on armored shields were built between the forts of the first and second fortified belts and east of the second belt:

- batteries inside the first belt:
  - du Canal (1875–1877), à Montigny-lès-Metz
  - du Chêne, south of fort Déroulède
  - batteries de Plappeville, between fort de Plappeville and the fortifications of Saint-Quentin
  - du Sablon, between Fort Saint-Privat and Fort de Queuleu
  - de Queuleu, behind Fort de Queuleu
- batteries inside the second belt
  - Sainte-Agathe, north of fort Déroulède and Gambetta
  - batterie de Montvaux, east of the François de Guise fortification group
  - batterie de Châtel, northeast of the groupe fortifié Jeanne-d’Arc
  - batterie d’Ars, east of groupe fortifié Driant
  - batterie de Crépy, south of fort de Queuleu
  - batterie des Veaux, north of groupe fortifié l’Yser
  - rabbit hole battery, east of forts Saint-Julien and Des Bordes.

To protect the front east of the second fortified belt, four artillery works were built between 1905 and 1909. From north to south, the Sainte-Barbe battery (1907–1909) monitored the Bouzonville road, the Silly battery (1905–1908) and the Mont battery (1905–1907) covered the Sarrebruck road, and the Sorbey battery (1905–1908) the road to Morhange.

- batteries east of the second belt:
  - Sainte-Barbes / Batterie lemmersberg (1907–1909)
  - Silly / Batterie lemmersberg (1905–1908)
  - Mont /Batterie Mont (1905–1907)
  - Sorbey /Batterie Sorbey (1905–1908)
  - de Landremont

in addition to these advance forts, many barracks remain from this period, such as Caserne Barbot, Caserne Bridoux, Colin, Desvallières, Dupuis, Féraudy, Lattre-de-Tassigny, Lizé, Raffenel, Reymond, Riberpray, Roques, Séré-de-Rivières, Serret, Steinmetz, and Thomassin as well as many military grounds in Metz and neighboring communities are all legacies of the military past of Metz.

== Bibliography ==
- Clayton Donnell, The German Fortress of Metz 1870-1944, Osprey Publishing, 2008.
- Christian Dropsy, Les fortifications de Metz et Thionville, Brussels, 1995.
- Alain Hohnadel, La bataille des Forts - Verdun face à Metz, 1995, ISBN 2-84048-087-5.
- Inge and Dieter Wernet, Die Feste Wagner, A.D.F.M., Helios-Verlag, Aachen, 2010.
- Heye, Festung Metz. – Vierteljahreshefte für Pioniere, 1936, p215
- Heye, Festung Metz und ihre Bedeutung in den August-Kämpfen 1914, Offizier-Bund, Berlin, 1937, 16, p. 36.
- Heye, Fortifikator-Armierg. der Festung Metz, 1914, Vierteljahreshefte für Pioniere, 1937, 4, pp. 155–170.
- Deutsche Reichsfestung Metz, sonst und jetzt, Militär-Wochenblatt, 60, 1875 pp. 1143–1150.
- Geschwindhammer (capitaine), Études sur des travaux du génie militaire allemand à Metz. Les réseaux allemands télégraphiques et téléphoniques de la place de Metz. Sur quelques ouvrages allemands des fortifications de Metz., in Revue du Génie militaire, 1925.
- Die Feste Metz Ueberall, number 38, Berlin, 1902.
- Die Festung Metz, Illustrierte Zeitung, volume 55 p. 171

== See also ==
- Fortifications of Metz
- Battle of Fort Driant
