= Fort Decaen =

Feste Schwerin/Fort Decaen

Site information
- Type: fort of type von Biehler

Location
- Location within France
- Coordinates: 49.08168°N 6.072898°E

Site history
- Built: 1878 - 1880
- Fate: not used

The Feste Schwerin, renamed fort Decaen by the French in 1919, is a military installation near Metz. It is part of the first fortified belt of forts of Metz and had its baptism of fire in late 1944, when Battle of Metz occurred.

== Historical context ==
The first fortified fort belt of Metz consists of

- Fort Saint-Privat (1870)
- Fort de Queuleu (1867)
- Fort des Bordes (1870)
- Fort de Saint-Julien (1867)
- Fort Gambetta
- Déroulède
- Decaen
- Fort de Plappeville (1867)
- Group Fortifications Of Saint-Quentin (1867)

Most were still unfinished in 1870 when the Franco-Prussian War burst out. During it was held by Germany, the German garrison at Metz oscillated between 15,000 and 20,000 men at the beginning of the period. and exceeded 25,000 men just before the First World War, It gradually became the premier stronghold of the German Reich.

== Construction and facilities ==
The Feste Schwerin is designed in the spirit of the "detached forts" concept developed by Hans Alexis von Biehler in Germany. The goal was to form a discontinuous enclosure around Metz with strong artillery batteries spaced with a range of guns. The fort was built by German engineers between 1878 and 1880.

== Successive assignments ==
From 1890 the garrison manned by the Corps XVI, stationed at Metz and Thionville. When it was taken over by the French army in 1919, the fort was renamed Fort Decaen. It was taken in 1940 by the Germans, who occupied it 1940–1944. Fort Decaen is no longer in use.

== Second World War ==
In early September 1944, at beginning of the Battle of Metz, and the German command integrated the defensive system set up around Metz. On September 2, 1944, Metz was declared one of the "Hitler fortresses", that must be defended to the last by German troops. The next day, September 3, 1944, the troops of General Walther Krause took position on a line from Pagny-sur-Moselle to Mondelange, passing west of Metz by Chambley-Bussières, Mars-la-Tour, Jarny and Briey. After an initial withdrawal on 6 September 1944, German lines rested firmly on the Forts of Metz. On November 9, 1944, as a prelude to the Allied assault on Metz, as many as 1,299 heavy bombers, B-17s and B-24s, dumped hundreds of bombs on fortifications and strategic points in the combat zone of the United States IIIrd army. Most bombers dropped their bombs without visibility from over 20,000 feet, so the military targets were often missed. At Metz the 689 loads of bombs destined to strike the seven forts, designated as priority targets, did nothing but collateral damage.

The Fort Jeanne d'Arc was the last of the forts of Metz to surrender. Determined German resistance, bad weather and floods, inopportunity, and a general tendency to underestimate the firepower of the fortifications of Metz, helped slow the US offensive, giving the opportunity to the German Army to withdraw in good order to the Saarland. The objective of the German staff, which was to stall US troops for the longest possible time at Metz before they could reach the Siegfried Line, was largely achieved.

=== See also ===
- Fortifications of Metz

== Notes and references ==
=== Bibliography ===
- Cole, Hugh M. (1950), The Lorraine Campaign, Washington, Center of Military History
