= Fort des Bordes =

Military structure located at Boric, Metz

Feste von Zastrow

Site information
- Type: fort of type von Biehler

Location
- Coordinates: 49.75°N 6.131°E

Site history
- Built: 1872
- Fate: destroyed in order to build road

The Feste von Zastrow, renamed Fort des Bordes by the French in 1919, is a military structure located in the district of Boric in Metz. It is part of the first fortified belt of the forts of Metz. Buried since the construction of the Eastern expressway in 1968, it is covered by a green space, although some remnants of the fort remain visible.

== Historical context ==
The first fortified belt of Metz consists of forts de Saint-Privat (1870) of Queuleu (1867), des Bordes (1870) Saint-Julien (1867), Gambetta, Déroulède, Decaen, Plappeville (1867) and St. Quentin (1867), most unfinished or still in the planning stages is in 1870, when the Franco-Prussian War burst out. During the Annexation, Metz will oscillate between a German garrison of 15,000 and 20,000 men at the beginning of period, and will exceed 25,000 men before the First World War gradually became the most important stronghold of the German Reich.

== Construction and facilities ==
The fort Zastrow is designed in the spirit of the "detached forts" concept developed by Hans Alexis von Biehler in Germany. The goal was to form a discontinuous enclosure around Metz with strong artillery batteries spaced with a range of guns. The interval between the Fort Queuleu ( Goeben ) and the Fort Saint-Julien ( Manteuffel ), being judged excessive, it was decided to strengthen the fortified line by building Fort Zastrow. The Feste Zatrow was quickly built by German engineers between 1873 and 1875.

== Successive assignments ==
From 1890 the relief of the garrison is guaranteed by the fort troops Corps XVI stationed at Metz and Thionville. The Fort des Bordes serves as a depot and barracks from 1873-1918. Then it is reinvested by the French army in 1919, and serves as an internment camp for draft evaders and deserters. In 1940, the fort is reinvested again by the German army. It is not remilitarised after 1945. The Fort des Bordes is closed permanently in 1954.

== Second World War ==
In early September 1944, at the beginning of the Battle of Metz. the German command integrated the defenses around Metz. On September 2, 1944, Metz was declared in effect by the Reich fortress Hitler. The fortress must be defended to the last by German troops, whose leaders were all sworn to the Führer. The next day, September 3, 1944, General Krause, then commander of the fortress of Metz, established his High Command, the main command post in the barracks fort Alvensleben. Fort Plappeville was indeed the center of the defenses of Metz, with the west fort Manstein (Girardin), run by the SS colonel Joachim von Siegroth, North Fort Zastrow (Les Bordes) held by SS Colonel Wagner and south Fort Prince August von Württemberg (Saint-Privat) held by the SS colonel Ernst Kemper. The same day, the troops of General Krause took position on a line from Pagny-sur-Moselle to Mondelange, passing to the west of Metz by Chambley-Bussières, Mars-la-Tour, Jarny and Briey.

On November 9, 1944, no less than 1,299 heavy bombers, both B-17s and B-24s, dump hundreds of bombs on fortifications and strategic points in the combat zone of Third army. Most bombers dropped their bombs without visibility from over 20,000 feet, so they often missed. In Metz, 689 loads of bombs hit the seven forts designated as priority targets. The bombing did nothing but cause collateral damage. At Thionville and Saarbrücken, the result is inconclusive, proving once again the inadequacy of the massive bombing of military targets.

But one by one, the isolated forts, attacked by the advancing troops of the 95th Infantry Division to the north, and 5th Infantry Division to the south, succumb. The Fort des Bordes was taken by 5th Infantry Division, part of George S. Patton's army, on November 21, 1944. at the end of the Battle of Metz. The fort Jeanne-d’Arc was the last of the forts of Metz to surrender. Determined German resistance, bad weather and floods, inopportunity, and a general tendency to underestimate the firepower of the fortifications of Metz, have helped slow the US offensive, giving the opportunity to the German Army to withdraw in good order to the Saar. The objective of the German staff, which was to save time by stalling US troops for the longest possible period, before they could advance to the front of the Siegfried Line, has been largely achieved.

== See also ==
- Fortifications of Metz
- Battle of Metz

== See as well ==
=== Bibliography ===
- Cole, Hugh M. (1950), The Lorraine Campaign, Washington, Center of Military History
