= Fort Gambetta =

Feste Hindersin/Fort Gambetta
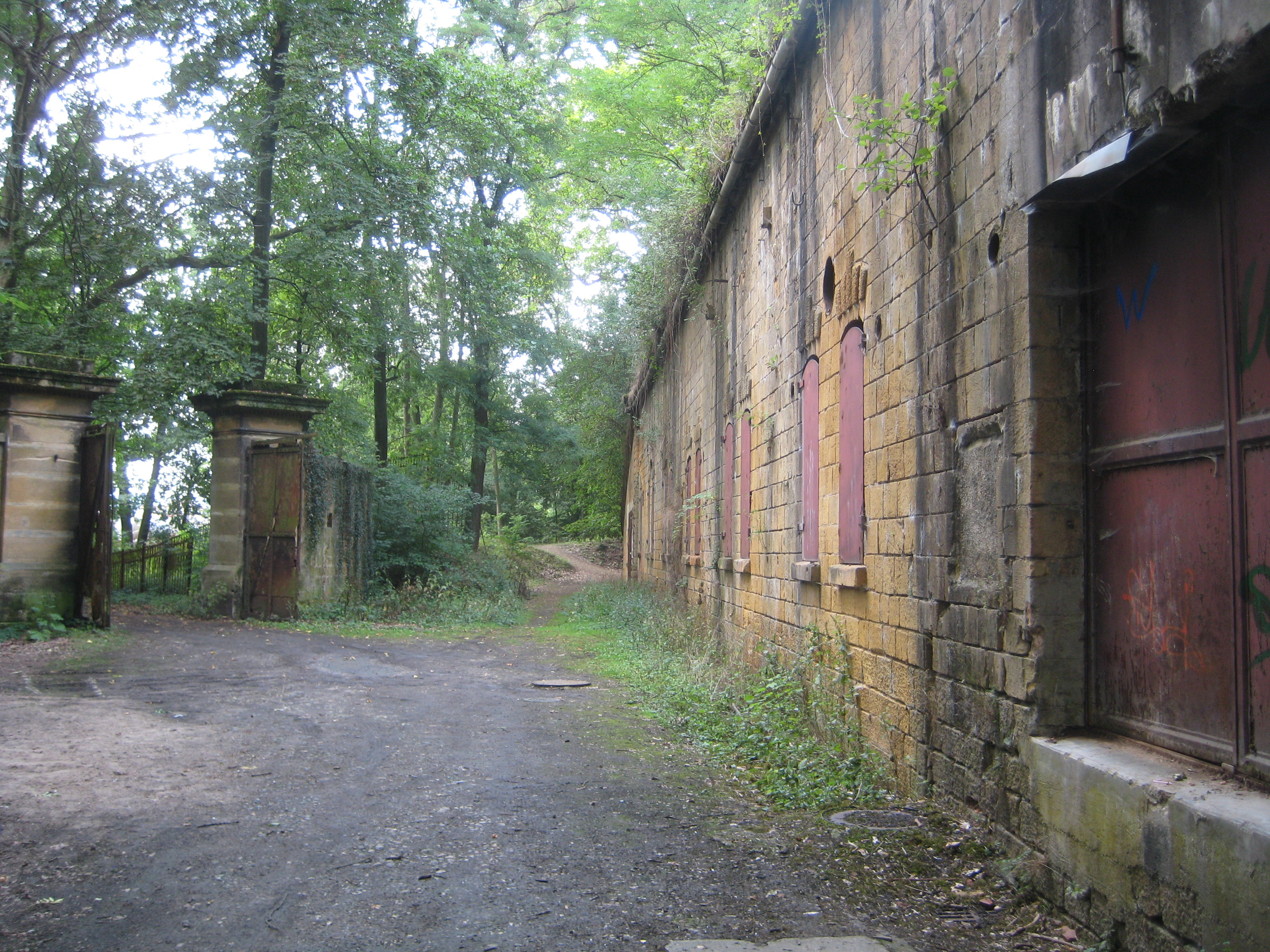
- Fort Gambetta

Site information
- Type: fort of type von Biehler

Location
- Location within France
- Coordinates: 49.0906°N 6.103°E

Site history
- Built: 1879–1881
- Fate: unused

The Feste Hindersin renamed Gambetta fort by the French in 1919, is a military installation near Metz. It is part of the first fortified belt of the forts of Metz and had its baptism of fire in late 1944, when the Battle of Metz occurred.

== Historical context ==
The first fortified belt of Metz consists of forts de Saint-Privat (1870), of Queuleu (1867), des Bordes (1870), Saint-Julien (1867), Gambetta, Déroulède, Decaen, Plappeville (1867) and St. Quentin (1867), most of them unfinished in 1870, when the Franco-Prussian War broke out. During the Annexation following this war, Metz, which oscillated between a German garrison of 15,000 and 20,000 men at the beginning of the period, reached up to 25,000 men in the garrison by the time of the First World War. Gradually Metz becomes the first stronghold of the German Reich. It is therefore necessary to finish the fortifications there.

== Construction and facilities ==
The feste Hindersin was designed in the spirit of the "detached forts" concept developed by Hans Alexis von Biehler in Germany. The goal was to form a discontinuous enclosure around Metz with strong artillery batteries spaced with a range of guns. Designed to complement the defensive line north of Metz, the Feste Hindersin was built between 1879 and 1881.

== Successive assignments ==
From 1890 relief of the garrison was provided by the fort troops Corps XVI stationed at Metz and Thionville. Invested by the French army in 1919, the fort Hindersin was renamed "fort Gambetta". It was taken again in 1940 by the Germans. The German army occupied the fort during 1940–1944. The fort is now disused.

== Second world War ==
On 2 September 1944, at the beginning of the Battle of Metz, the old city fortress was declared a fortress of the Reich by Hitler. The fortress had to be defended to the last by German troops, whose leaders were all sworn to the Führer. The German command integrated Fort Gambetta into the defensive system set up around Metz. The next day, 3 September 1944, the troops of General Krause took their positions on a line from Pagny-sur-Moselle to Mondelange, passing to the west of Metz by Chambley, Mars-la-Tour, Jarny and Briey. After an initial withdrawal, made on 6 September 1944, the German lines, stationed by troops of the 462e Volksgrenadier division, rested firmly on the forts of Metz.

The US offensive, launched 7 September 1944, on the west line forts of Metz, was cut short. American troops would eventually stop on the Moselle, despite taking two bridgeheads south of Metz. As the forts were better defended than the Americans had thought, the US troops were out of breath. General McLain, in agreement with the General Walker, decided to suspend the attacks, pending new plans of the General Staff of 90th Infantry Division. When hostilities resumed after a rainy month, the soldiers of the 462th Volks-Grenadier-Division held firmly the forts of Metz, though supplies were difficult under artillery fire and frequent bombings.

As a prelude to the assault on Metz, on 9 November 1944, the US Air Force sent no less than 1,299 heavy bombers, both B-17s and B-24s, to dump 3,753 tons of bombs, and 1,000 to 2,000 "livres" on the fortifications and strategic points in the combat zone of IIIrd army. Most bombers dropped bombs without visibility at over 20,000 feet, so the military targets were often missed. In Metz, 689 loads of bombs hit the seven forts of Metz, identified as priority targets, merely causing collateral damage, proving once again the inadequacy of the massive bombing of military targets.

After several weeks of fighting in the Messina region, US troops launched the final assault on Metz in November 1944. On 15 November 1944, 377th Infantry Regiment of 95th American division, leaving from Maizières-lès-Metz, enters Woippy. Facing them, were the men of the 1515 Grenadier-Regiment " Stössel " of the 462e Volksgrenadier division, reinforced by a reserve company of the SS-Panzergrenadier Regiment 38, which gave desperate resistance. Harassing fighting continued all day on 16 November. The fort Gambetta was attacked in turn in the day by the 3rd Battalion 377 Infantry regiment. On the night of 16 November 1944, under the pressure of the 377th and 378th American regiments, the German grenadiers eventually fall back in disorder on Metz, leaving behind, artillery, trucks, weapons stocks and their dying. The bloody fighting continued the next day around the fort, which isolated and neutralized, finally surrendered.

The fort Jeanne-d’Arc was the last of the forts of Metz to surrender. Determined German resistance, bad weather and floods, inopportunity, and a general tendency to underestimate the firepower of the fortifications of Metz, helped slow the US offensive, giving the German Army the opportunity to withdraw in good order to the Saar. The objective of the German staff, which was to save time by stalling US troops for the longest possible time before those troops could reach the Siegfried Line, was largely achieved.

== See also ==
- Forts of Metz
- Fortifications of Metz
- Battle of Metz

== Bibliography ==
- Cole, Hugh M. (1950). The Lorraine Campaign. Washington: Center of Military History.
