= Fort Déroulède =

Feste Kameke/Fort Deroulede

Site information
- Type: fort of type von Biehler

Location
- Location within France
- Coordinates: 49.0857°N 6.0821°E

Site history
- Built: 1876–1879
- Fate: not used

The Feste Kameke, renamed Fort Déroulède by the French in 1919, is a military installation near Metz. It is part of the first fortified belt of forts of Metz and had its baptism of fire in late 1944, in the Battle of Metz.

== Historical context ==
The first fortified belt of Metz consists of forts Fort Saint-Privat (1870), Fort de Queuleu (1867), Fort Bordes (1870), Fort de Saint-Julien (1867), Fort Gambetta, Fort Déroulède, Fort Decaen, Fort de Plappeville (1867) and Group Fortifications of Saint-Quentin (1867), most of them unfinished in 1870, when the Franco-Prussian War broke out. During the Annexation Metz, oscillated between a German garrison of 15,000 and 20,000 men at the beginning of the period, and will exceed 25,000 men just before the First World War. Gradually Metz becomes the premier stronghold of the German Reich.

== Construction and facilities ==
The Feste Kameke is designed in the spirit of the "detached forts" concept developed by Hans Alexis von Biehler in Germany. The goal was to form a discontinuous enclosure around Metz with strong artillery batteries spaced with a range of guns. The fort was built by German engineers between 1876 and 1879.

== Successive assignments ==
From 1890 the stationing of the garrison is guaranteed by the fort troops Corps XVI stationed at Metz and Thionville. Invested by the French army in 1919, the fort Kameke is renamed "fort Déroulède". It was taken again in 1940 by the Germans. The German army occupied the fort during 1940–1944. After the war, the fort was taken over by the French army. Until 2002, the fort served as a repository of chemical weapons, bombs or unexploded shell of phosgene or sulfur mustard, mainly dating from World War I. The fort is now not used.

== World War II ==
In early September 1944 the Battle of Metz began. The German command integrated the defensive system set up around Metz. On 2 September 1944, Metz was declared a Hitler Reich fortress. The fortress must be defended to the last by German troops, whose leaders were all sworn to the Führer. The next day, 3 September 1944, the troops of General Krause took position on a line from Pagny-sur-Moselle to Mondelange, passing to the west of Metz by Chambley, Mars-la-Tour, Jarny and Briey. After an initial withdrawal on 6 September 1944, the German lines now rest firmly on the forts of Metz.

The US offensive, launched 7 September 1944, on the western line of the forts of Metz, was cut short. American troops stopped at the Moselle, despite taking two bridgeheads to the south of Metz. The forts being better defended than they had thought, US troops were figuratively out of breath. General McLain, in agreement with the General Walker, decided to suspend the attacks, pending new plans from the General Staff of the 90th Infantry Division. When hostilities resumed after a rainy month, the soldiers of the 462 Volks-Grenadier-Division still firmly held the forts of Metz, though supply lines were more difficult under artillery fire and frequent bombings.

On 9 November 1944, as a prelude to the assault on Metz, as many as 1,299 heavy bombers, B-17s and B-24s, dumped 3,753 tons of bombs, and 1,000 to 2,000 "livres" on fortifications and strategic points in the combat zone of IIIrd Army. Most bombers dropped bombs without visibility at over 20,000 feet and miss their objectives. In Metz, 689 loads of bombs drop over the seven forts of Metz, designated as priority targets, merely causing collateral damage. At Thionville and at Saarbrücken the result is inconclusive, proving once again the inadequacy of massive bombings on fortified targets. On 15 November 1944, on a cool, damp morning, 377th Infantry Regiment of 95th American division, left Maizières-lès-Metz, entering the north of Metz in Woippy before being stopped by gunfire from fort Déroulède (Kameke), Gambetta (Hindersin), and Saint-Julien (Manteuffel). Facing them, giving desperate resistance, were the men of 1515 Grenadier-Regiment " Stössel " of the 462th Volks-Grenadier-Division, reinforced by a reserve company, the 38th SS-Panzergrenadier Regiment. On 17 November 1944, all the forts held by German troops, in the northwest sector of Metz, were encircled. On 21 November 1944, 377th Infantry Regiment of 95th US division attacked the old fort Kameke. The fort Jeanne-d’Arc was the last of the forts of Metz to surrender. Determined German resistance, bad weather and floods, inopportunity, and a general tendency to underestimate the firepower of the fortifications of Metz, helped slow the US offensive, giving the opportunity to the German Army to withdraw in good order to the Saar. The objective of the German staff, which was to stall US troops for the longest possible time before they could reach the Siegfried Line, was largely achieved.

== See also ==
- Forts of Metz
- Fortifications of Metz
- Battle of Metz

== Bibliography ==
- Cole, Hugh M. (1950). The Lorraine Campaign. Washington: Center of Military History.
