= Fort de Saint-Julien =

Feste Manteuffel/Fort Saint-Julien
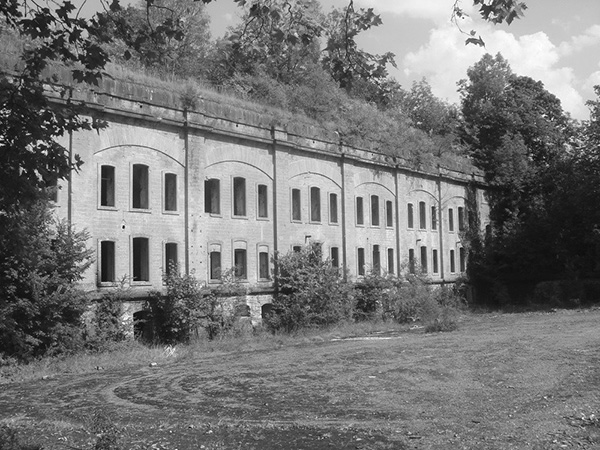
- Fort de Saint-Julien, commune Saint-Julien-lès-Metz, département Moselle, France

Site information
- Type: fort of type Séré de Rivières

Location
- Location within France
- Coordinates: 49.0827°N 6.124°E

Site history
- Built: 1867–1870
- Fate: not used

The Fort de Saint-Julien, renamed Feste Manteuffel in German, is a military installation near Metz. It is part of the first fortified belt forts of Metz and had its baptism of fire in late 1944 during the Battle of Metz.

== Historical context ==
The first fortified belt consisted of Fort Saint-Privat (1870) Fort de Queuleu (1867), Fort des Bordes (1870), Saint-Julien (1867), Fort Gambetta, Fort Déroulède, Fort Decaen, Fort de Plappeville (1867) and Group Fortifications of Saint-Quentin (1867); most of them were unfinished or still in the planning stages in 1870, when the Franco-Prussian War broke out. During the period of German control following this war, Metz had a German garrison of 15,000 and 20,000 men at the beginning of this period, and housed more than 25,000 men before the First World War, gradually becoming the most important stronghold of the German Reich.

== Construction and facilities ==
Fort Saint-Julien is located in the hills above Saint-Julien-lès-Metz and overlooks the city of Metz and the Moselle valley. The fort follows the spirit of the "detached forts" concept developed by Raymond Adolphe Séré de Rivières in France and Hans Alexis von Biehler in Germany. The goal was to form a discontinuous enclosure around Metz of artillery forts spaced a cannon shot apart. Work began in 1867. The fort was not complete in 1870, when war broke out between France and Germany. The defensive system was completed and perfected by German engineers between 1871 and 1891. The fort, pentagonal, is a bastion. Half buried behind a defensive system on a slope, the main casern is designed to withstand artillery fire. The fort is surrounded by a system of dry moats, evoking the fortifications of Sébastien Le Prestre de Vauban.

== Successive assignments ==
While Alsace-Lorraine was under German control after the Franco-Prussian War, the fort became a training camp for German imperial troops. From 1890 the troops in the fort were provided by the XVI Army Corps stationed at Metz and Thionville. From 1914 to 1918, the fort served as a relay for German soldiers at the front line. Surrendered to the French army in 1919, the fort was re-taken twenty years later by the Germans during World War II. Beginning in September 1944, German troops reorganized its defense, and integrated the fort with the defensive system set up around Metz. After World War II, the fort was abandoned. Part of the fort now houses a restaurant specializing in dishes from Alsace and Lorraine.

== Second World War ==
In late August 1944, at the beginning of the Battle of Metz, the German command integrated the defensive system set up around Metz. On 2 September 1944, Metz was declared a Hitler Reich fortress, to be defended to the last by German troops whose leaders were all sworn to the Führer. The next day General Walther Krause, then commander of the fortress of Metz, established his High Command, the main command post in the barracks was Fort de Plappeville, then known as Feste Alvensleben. The same day, the troops of General Krause took position on a line from Pagny-sur-Moselle to Mondelange, passing to the west of Metz by Chambley-Bussières, Mars-la-Tour, Jarny and Briey. After an initial withdrawal, starting 6 September 1944, the German lines rested firmly on the forts of Metz.

The US offensive, launched 7 September 1944 on the west line of the forts of Metz was cut short. American troops, stopped at the Moselle, despite taking two bridgeheads south of Metz, better defended than expected, were now low on supplies and figuratively out of breath. General Raymond McLain, in agreement with General Edwin Walker, decided to suspend the attack, pending new plans from the General Staff of the 90th Infantry Division. When hostilities resumed after a rainy month, the soldiers of the 462 Volks-Grenadier-Division still held firm to the forts of Metz, though supplies lines were more difficult under artillery fire and frequent bombings.

As a prelude to the assault on Metz, on 9 November 1944, the Air Force sent some 1,300 heavy bombers, both Boeing B-17 Flying Fortresses and Consolidated B-24 Liberators, and dumped hundreds of bombs on fortifications and strategic points in the combat zone of the Third Army. As most bombers had no visibility and dropped their bombs from over 20,000 feet, the military targets were often missed. In Metz, 689 loads of bombs hit the seven forts identified as priority targets, but merely caused collateral damage.

In the morning fog of 18 November 1944, Colonel Donald Bacon gave the signal for the attack by the 2nd Battalion 378 Infantry Regiment on the Fort Saint-Julien. The fort's strong position on the main road from Metz was in fact an essential goal. The assault battalion silently encircled the fort and attacked at 7:00 am precisely. The road down to Metz was then held by a company of the 462 Volks-Grenadier-Division that the US artillery campaign finally dislodged from the houses below, completing the encirclement of the fort around noon. American tanks and self-propelled guns then took position around the fort. For an hour, the 240-mm howitzers of Task force fired tirelessly preparing for the infantry attack. The soldiers of the 378th Infantry Regiment then rushed through a gap at the back of the fort, under fire from machine guns. Two light tanks provided covering fire, while a tank destroyer took position near the entrance and shot at the fort, which nevertheless resisted. Finally, a self-propelled 155 mm gun managed to break the door. In the absence of heavy weaponry, the 200 German soldiers of the 462nd Volks-Grenadier-Division were trapped in the fort and could do nothing against American firepower. The next morning, in the mist of 19 November 1944, the small detachment of 462 Volks-Grenadier-Division finally agreed to surrender to US troops.

The fort Jeanne-d’Arc was the last of the forts of Metz to disarm. Determined German resistance, bad weather, floods, inopportunity, and a general tendency to underestimate the firepower of the fortifications of Metz, have helped slow the US offensive, giving the opportunity to the German Army to withdraw in good order to the Saar. The objective of the German staff, which was to gain the most possible time in keeping the US troops from arriving at the front of the Siegfried Line, was largely achieved.

== See as well ==
=== Bibliography ===
- Cole, Hugh M. (1950), The Lorraine Campaign, Washington, Center of Military History

=== Related articles ===
- Forts of Metz
- Fortifications of Metz
- Battle of Metz
