= Déroulède =

Déroulède is a surname. Notable people with this surname include:

- Paul Déroulède (1846–1914), French author and politician
- Pauline Déroulède (born 1990), French wheelchair tennis player

== See also ==
- Fort Déroulède, French military fort
