= Jean Burger =

French resistance fighter (1907–1945)

Jean Burger, alias "Mario", was a member of the French Resistance during World War II. A member of the French communist party, he was born in Metz on 16 February 1907 and died at the Mittelbau-Dora concentration camp on 3 April 1945.

== Biography ==
=== Youth and political engagement ===
Born into a family of tradesmen, Jean Burger studied at the Ecole Normale de Montigny and became a teacher in the industrial basin of Lorraine. He rose rapidly in the Communist Party and became departmental secretary for the Moselle anti-fascist movement Paix et Liberté ("Peace and Liberty"). Burger became involved in recruitment for the International Brigades during the Spanish Civil War. In September 1939, Burger was mobilized as part of the 460th Pioneer Regiment of the French Army and was stationed on the Maginot Line where he was taken prisoner on 17 June 1940. Burger and his brother escaped during Pentecost in 1941. Jean Burger took the pseudonym René Legrand at this time.

=== Resistance ===
Charles Hoeffel, a Communist Party militant and member of the CGT railway workers' union, put Burger into contact with Georges Wodli, a member of the Communist Party Central Committee. Wodli asked Burger to organize Communist resistance in the Moselle region. Burger organized the "Mario" resistance group, whose activities included the printing and distribution of leaflets, collection of arms, aid to prisoners and resisters, and sabotage. Three thousand men and women participated in the Mario group. The organization was integrated into the national resistance movement and had contacts in Paris and Luxembourg. Activities included aid to German deserters and assistance for Soviet prisoners of war in camps in the Moselle region.

=== Arrest ===
Massive arrests of resisters began in August 1943. The arrests were aided by information seized by the Gestapo in 1940 from the Direction centrale des renseignements généraux, the intelligence service of the French National Police. Jean Burger was arrested in Metz on 21 September 1943 by the Germans, who had set a trap for resisters. As a result, by the time American troops arrived in the area in 1944, the Mario group had practically ceased to exist.

After his arrest, Burger was tortured by the Gestapo, then moved to a military prison in Metz. From there he went to the Fort de Queuleu just outside Metz, which was used as a detention and interrogation center for members of the Resistance. In November 1944 he was sent to prisons in Mannheim and Wiesbaden, then to Dachau concentration camp. as American forces were closing in on Metz. Not long after arriving at Dachau, he was moved to the Auschwitz concentration camp. With the approach of Soviet forces, Burger and a few other Marios were marched to Gleiwitz in Silesia. Finally moved to an annex of the Dora concentration camp, he was mortally wounded while weakened by pneumonia during an American bombing raid on the Mittelwerk complex.

== Legacy ==
In memory of Burger, a number of streets and buildings in the Mosellle département bear his name, as well as the Jean-Burger-Straße in Magdeburg, Germany, where a commemorative monument was erected.

== Bibliography ==
- Léon Burger, Le groupe Mario, une page de la Résistance lorraine, Hellenbrand, 1965 (Léon was Jean's brother)
- Eugène Heiser, La Tragédie lorraine, Tome I, Pierron, 1984
- Marcel Neigert, Internements et déportations en LorraineUniversité de Metz, 1978
