= Derhan group =

The Derhan group was an element of the French resistance in the Moselle department of France during World War II. It was founded by Joseph Derhan, a laborer from Hagondange who had in 1942 formed a group called the Parti de Gaulle composed of fifteen workers from the valley of the Orne, who supported Charles de Gaulle.

Active in 1942 and 1943, the group was dismantled by the Nazis between January and May 1944. The members were tried between 7 and 13 November 1944 at Bayreuth. Joseph Derhan (1903–1944), the principal activist, was already dead, having died ten days after his arrest, under torture, at the Fort de Queuleu near Metz.

The group had been given the missions of collecting arms for the Liberation, distributing pro-Gaullist propaganda, inciting German draft resisters and French citizens avoiding the Reichsarbeitsdienst labor corps.
