= Raymond Adolphe Séré de Rivières =

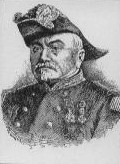
- Born: May 20, 1815; Albi, France
- Died: February 16, 1895 (aged 79); Paris, France
- Alma mater: École polytechnique
- Military career
- Allegiance: France
- Branch: French Army
- Service years: 1835 – 1880
- Rank: Brigadier general
- Conflicts: Second Italian War of Independence; Franco-Prussian War; Paris Commune
- Awards: Grand Officer of the Legion of Honour

Raymond Adolphe Séré de Rivières (French pronunciation: [ʁɛmɔ̃ adɔlf seʁe də ʁivjɛʁ]; 20 May 1815 – 16 February 1895) was a French military engineer and general whose ideas revolutionized the design of fortifications in France. He gave his name to the Séré de Rivières system of fortifications constructed after the Franco-Prussian War of 1870. Described as the Vauban of the 19th century, his Belgian counterpart was Henri Alexis Brialmont.

== Early life ==
Raymond Adolphe Séré de Rivières was born on 20 May 1815 in Albi, France. His family had been part of the nobility as recently as the 17th century. Studying in Paris, he was admitted in 1833 to the École militaire de Saint-Cyr, but he chose not to enter, preferring to pursue the study of law. He entered the École polytechnique in 1835, where the students included Adolphe Thiers, the future Prime Minister. After two years at Polytechnique he left with the rank of sub-lieutenant. He enrolled at the École d'Application de l'Artillerie et du Génie at Metz where he became familiar with the principals of permanent fortification. In 1839 he joined the second regiment of engineers at Arras where he refined his studies, inspired by the ideas of the Marquis de Montalembert. He was promoted to lieutenant in 1841, then captain second class in January 1843, and was nominated to the engineering district of Toulon in April of the same year. At this post he showed his abilities with the design of fortifications. At Toulon his work included the Caserne du Centre and the Fort du Cap-Brun. While at Toulon he married the daughter of the mayor of Toulon in September 1847.

He was successively posted to:

- Perpignan in October 1848,
- Castres in March 1849,
- Carcassonne in July 1853,
- Orléans in March 1860 (after having participated in the Second Italian War of Independence in 1859)
- Paris-north in October 1860,
- Nice in January 1862,
- Metz in August 1864,
- Lyon in April 1868.

His governing idea concerning fortifications - to defend a given place using detached forts arranged in a line - was first used in the places where Séré de Rivières worked: Toulon, as well as Nice (the Tête de Chien and the Drette et de la Revère works), Metz (Forts Saint-Quentin, Plappeville, Saint-Julien and Queuleu, and Lyon (encirclement linking the Caluire and Montessuy forts).

== The Franco-Prussian War ==
In 1870, Séré de Rivières was able to control an urban insurrection in Lyon and to put the city in a state of defense; these accomplishments earned him a promotion to brigadier general in October. Three months later he was named commander of the engineers of the 24th Corps of the Army of the East under the orders of General Charles Denis Bourbaki, receiving significant credit for the French victory at Arcey. This earned a promotion to commander of the Armée de l'Est's engineers. Some weeks later at the head of the engineers of the 2nd Corps of the Army of Versailles, he directed the sieges of the Fort d'Issy, the Fort de Vanves and the Fort de Montrouge, which had been occupied during the Commune, capturing them in May 1871. In the autumn of 1871, Séré de Rivières was in charge of a review of the French defenses along the Italian border. In 1872 he prepared an analysis on the fall of Metz in 1870 for Marshal François Achille Bazaine, with a full published report following on 6 March 1873.

== The Séré de Rivières system ==
In June 1873 Séré de Rivières became secretary of the Committee of Defense, which had been established by Prime Minister Adolphe Thiers. Opposed to the policies of General Charles Auguste Frossard, Séré de Rivières had the opportunity to explain in detail his plan for the reorganization of France's borders. The plan envisioned a combination of offense and defense, with both static and moving elements. The plan was based on a system of strong defensive lines that would channel an enemy to a waiting army. The system took into account the evolution of armaments, and sought to maneuver an attacker away from Paris. This concept was first proposed by Vauban, but was not according to the taste of the times, in part because of the defeat of 1871. Vauban-style fortifications had proven to be poorly suited to new weapons and tactics, and required a complete rethinking of design and employment. Two texts were essential to the doctrine:

- Considérations sur la reconstitution de la frontière de l'Est ("Considerations on the reconstitution of the eastern frontier"), submitted to the Committee on 21 June 1873, adopted unanimously and published on 15 November;
- Exposé sur le système défensif de la France ("Discussion on the defensive system of France"), presented on 20 May 1874. On 17 July a law relative to the implementation of the defensive measures for the eastern defenses of France was adopted.

In 1874 Séré de Rivières became director of the Service du Génie (Military Engineer Service) at the Ministry of Defense, charged by General François Charles du Barail with the construction of defenses from Dunkerque to Nice which would bear his name. The project was launched on 17 July 1874 by unanimous vote. The northern and north-eastern frontiers were divided into four groups comprising the Jura, the Vosges, the Meuse (river) region, and the northern frontier from Montmédy to Dunkerque.

The program also addressed the Italian frontier's defenses, reinforcing older mountain fortresses. The defenses of the important southern cities of Lyon, Nice and Toulon were also improved. Séré de Rivières' influence is also visible on the Spanish border and along the Atlantic coast, as well Paris, where a new, more distant ring of forts was built to place the city out of artillery range.

Séré de Rivières was replaced as head of the Gènie in 1880 in a political intrigue, but his program continued without significant changes until 1885. In all, 196 forts, 58 smaller works and 278 batteries were built along the borders and at strategic points within the country, for an expenditure estimated at 450 million francs for the works and 229 million francs for their armament.

== Death ==
Séré de Rivières died on 16 February 1895 in Paris. He is buried in Père-Lachaise cemetery in a modest tomb bearing the inscription "Lapides clamabunt" ("the stones will testify").

== See also ==
- Séré de Rivières system
- Ceintures de Lyon
- The works of Antonin Mercié
