= Mars-la-Tour =

- Commune
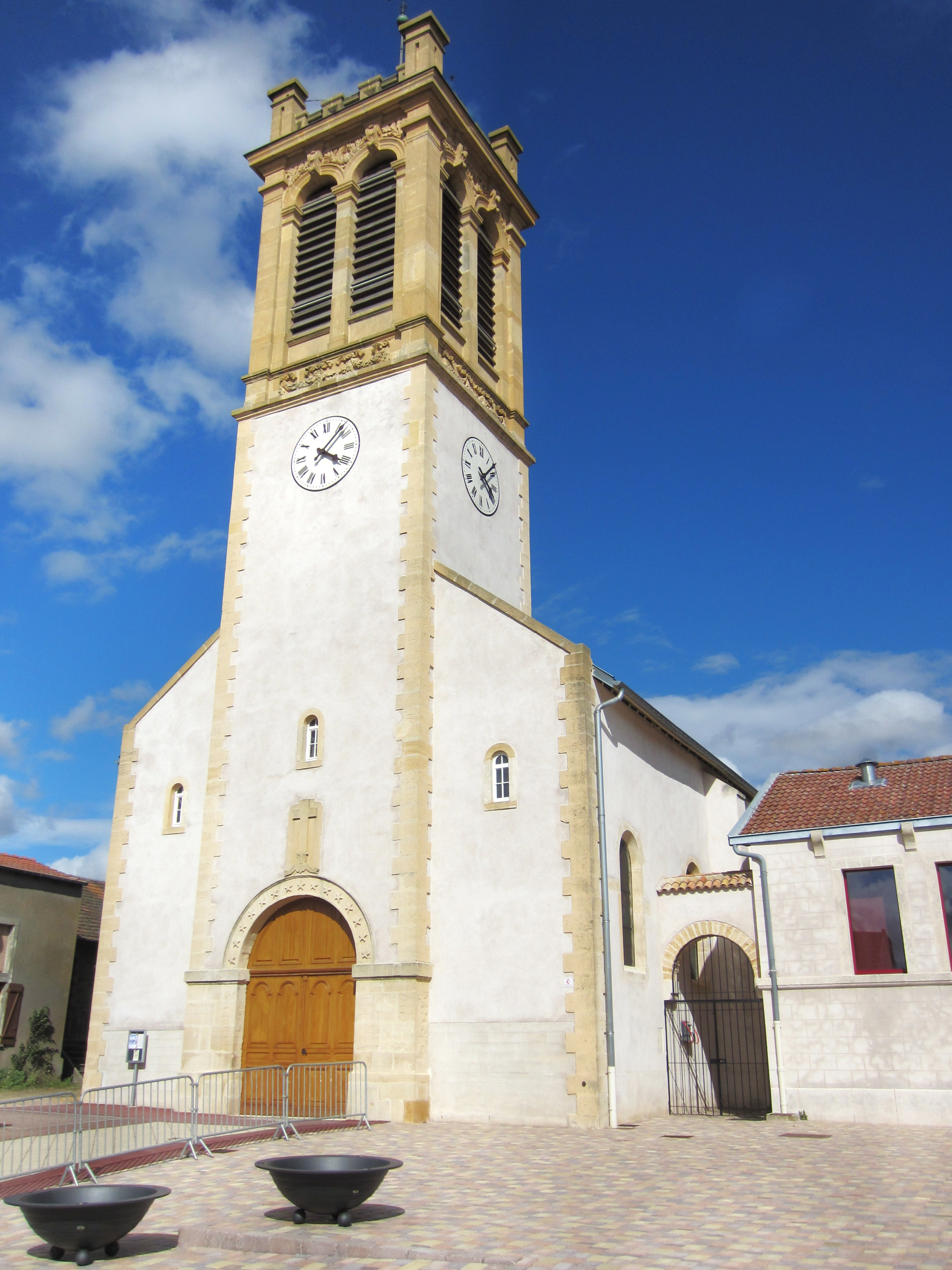
- The church in Mars-la-Tour

- Coat of arms
- Location of Mars-la-Tour
- Location within France Location within Grand Est
- Coordinates: 49°05′59″N 5°53′12″E
- Country: France
- Region: Grand Est
- Department: Meurthe-et-Moselle
- Arrondissement: Toul
- Canton: Jarny

Government
  - Mayor (2020–2026): Roger dalla Costa
- Area^{1}: 12.64 km^{2} (4.88 sq mi)
- Elevation: 239 m (784 ft)
- Highest elevation: 263 m (863 ft)
- Lowest elevation: 197 m (646 ft)
- Population (2023): 875
  - Density: 69.2/km^{2} (179/sq mi)
- Time zone: UTC+01:00 (CET)
  - Summer (DST): UTC+02:00 (CEST)
- INSEE/Postal code: 54353 /54800
- ^{1} French Land Register data, which excludes lakes, ponds, glaciers > 1 km^{2} (0.386 sq mi or 247 acres) and river estuaries.

Mars-la-Tour (French pronunciation: [maʁs la tuʁ]) is a commune in the Meurthe-et-Moselle department in northeastern France.

== History ==
The Battle of Mars-la-Tour was fought on 16 August 1870 during the Franco-Prussian War near the town of Mars-la-Tour.

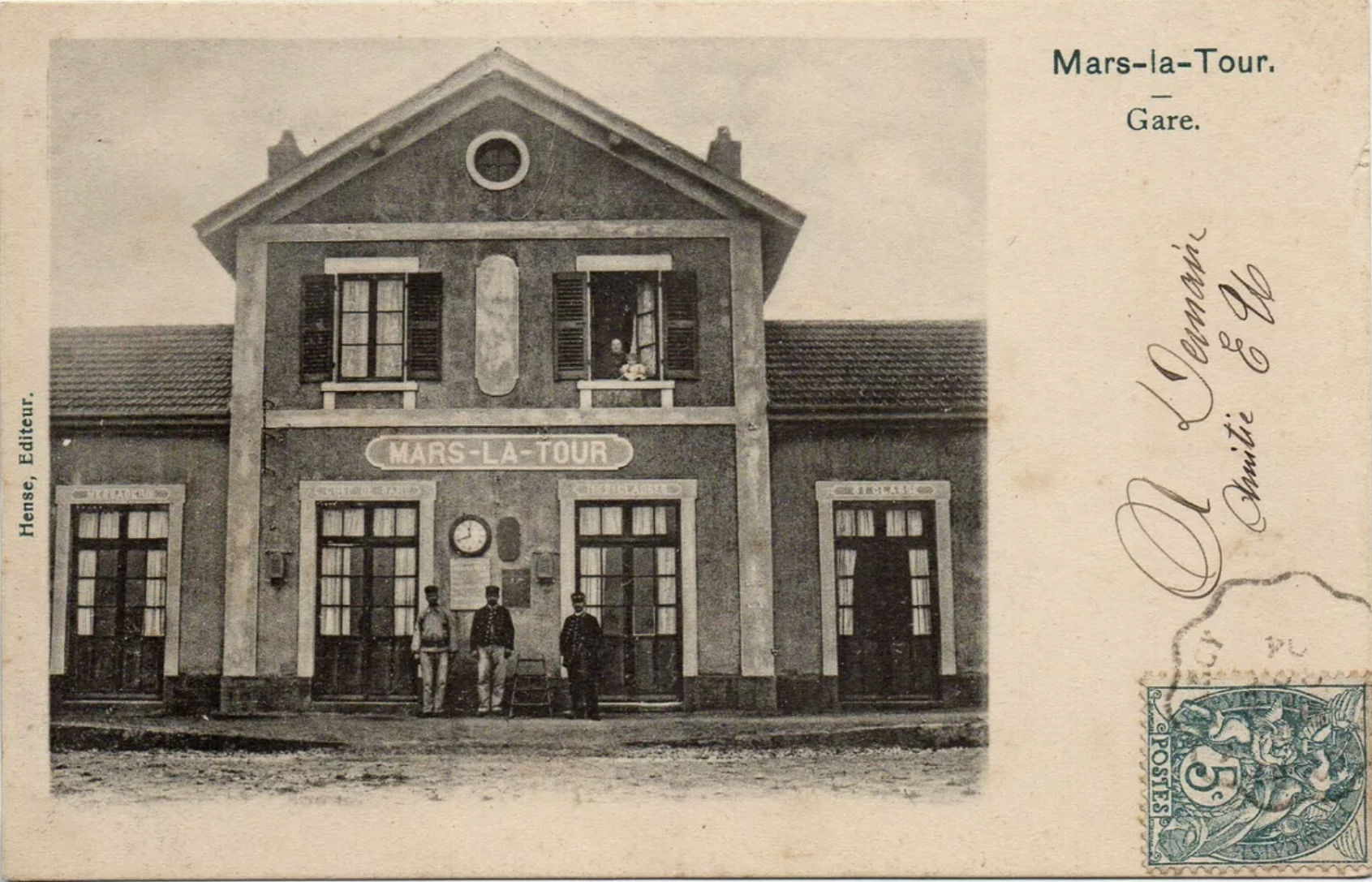
Former railway station of Mars-la-Tour, ca. 1900.

The railway line between Longuyon and Pogny reached Mars-la-Tour in 1876, at which time a small train station was built. On 30 August 1919 the station witnessed a minor accident when a freight train collided with a train full of coal, killing one train's conductor. The station no longer exists, however.

== See also ==
- Communes of the Meurthe-et-Moselle department
- Parc naturel régional de Lorraine
