= Pagny-sur-Moselle =

- Commune
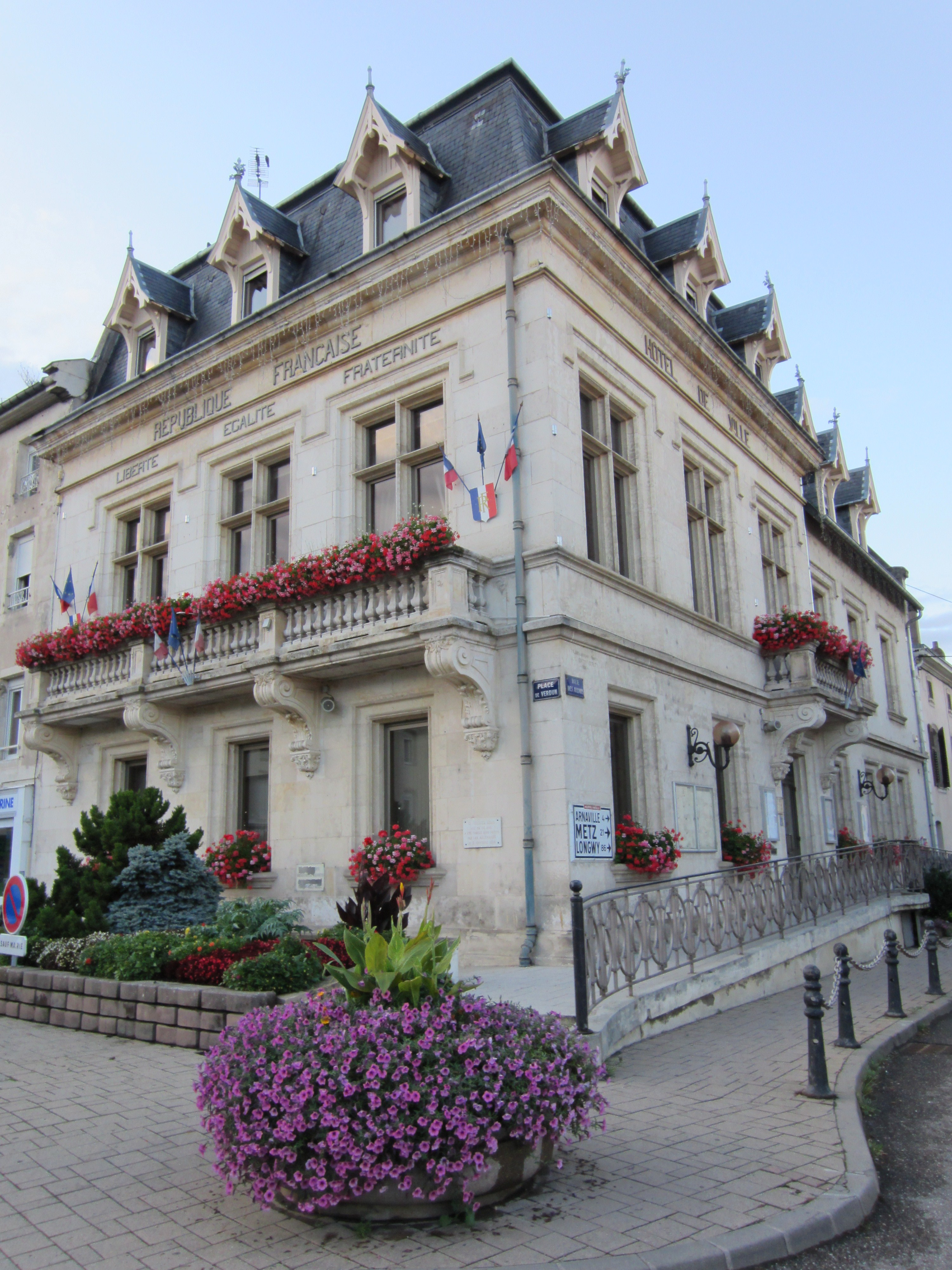
- The town hall in Pagny-sur-Moselle

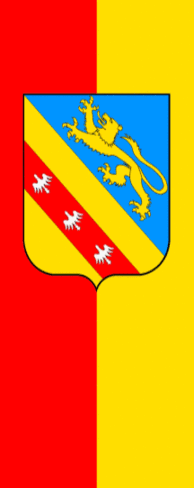
- Flag Coat of arms
- Location of Pagny-sur-Moselle
- Location within France Location within Grand Est
- Coordinates: 48°59′02″N 6°01′19″E
- Country: France
- Region: Grand Est
- Department: Meurthe-et-Moselle
- Arrondissement: Nancy
- Canton: Pont-à-Mousson

Government
  - Mayor (2020–2026): René Bianchin
- Area^{1}: 11.2 km^{2} (4.3 sq mi)
- Elevation: 184 m (604 ft)
- Highest elevation: 360 m (1,180 ft)
- Lowest elevation: 171 m (561 ft)
- Population (2023): 3,919
  - Density: 350/km^{2} (906/sq mi)
- Time zone: UTC+01:00 (CET)
  - Summer (DST): UTC+02:00 (CEST)
- INSEE/Postal code: 54415 /54530
- ^{1} French Land Register data, which excludes lakes, ponds, glaciers > 1 km^{2} (0.386 sq mi or 247 acres) and river estuaries.

Pagny-sur-Moselle (French pronunciation: [paɲi syʁ mɔzɛl], literally Pagny on Moselle) is a commune in the Meurthe-et-Moselle department in north-eastern France.

== Population ==
Historical population
Year	Pop.	±% p.a.
1968	3,525	—
1975	3,732	+0.82%
1982	3,707	−0.10%
1990	4,227	+1.65%
1999	4,078	−0.40%
2007	4,123	+0.14%
2012	4,024	−0.48%
2017	4,140	+0.57%
2023	3,919	−0.91%
Source: INSEE

== See also ==
- Communes of the Meurthe-et-Moselle department
- Parc naturel régional de Lorraine
