= Jarny =

- Commune
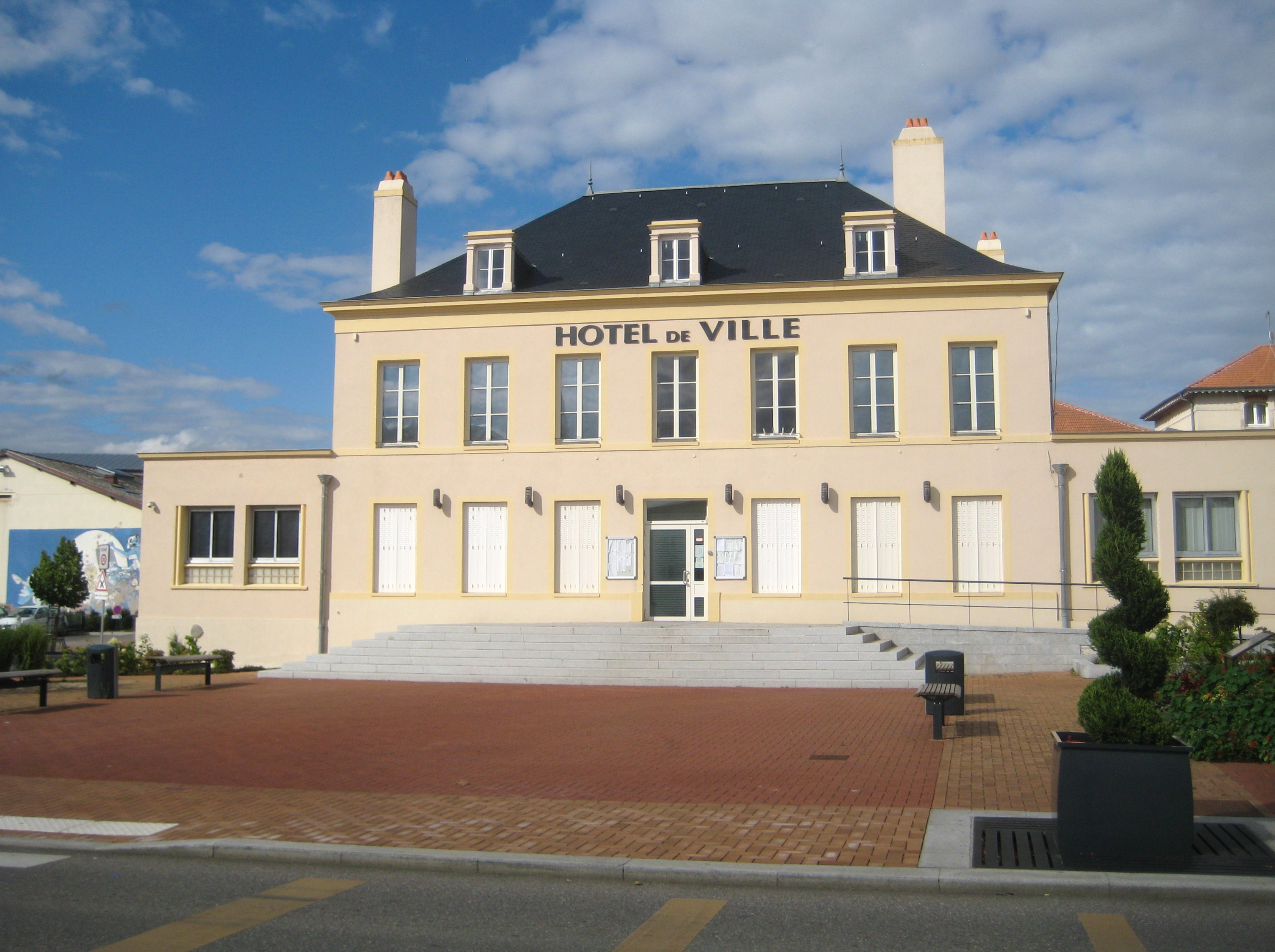
- The town hall in Jarny

- Coat of arms
- Location of Jarny
- Location within France Location within Grand Est
- Coordinates: 49°09′35″N 5°52′41″E
- Country: France
- Region: Grand Est
- Department: Meurthe-et-Moselle
- Arrondissement: Val-de-Briey
- Canton: Jarny
- Intercommunality: Orne Lorraine Confluences

Government
  - Mayor (2024–2026): Olivier Tritz
- Area^{1}: 15.6 km^{2} (6.0 sq mi)
- Elevation: 220 m (720 ft)
- Highest elevation: 236 m (774 ft)
- Lowest elevation: 185 m (607 ft)
- Population (2023): 8,050
  - Density: 516/km^{2} (1,340/sq mi)
- Time zone: UTC+01:00 (CET)
  - Summer (DST): UTC+02:00 (CEST)
- INSEE/Postal code: 54273 /54800
- ^{1} French Land Register data, which excludes lakes, ponds, glaciers > 1 km^{2} (0.386 sq mi or 247 acres) and river estuaries.

Jarny (French pronunciation: [ʒaʁni]) is a commune in the Meurthe-et-Moselle department in north-eastern France.

== Population ==
Historical population
Year	Pop.	±% p.a.
1968	9,236	—
1975	9,287	+0.08%
1982	8,849	−0.69%
1990	8,401	−0.65%
1999	8,377	−0.03%
2007	8,447	+0.10%
2012	8,389	−0.14%
2017	8,283	−0.25%
2023	8,050	−0.47%
Source: INSEE

== See also ==
- Communes of the Meurthe-et-Moselle department
