= Chambley-Bussières =

- Commune
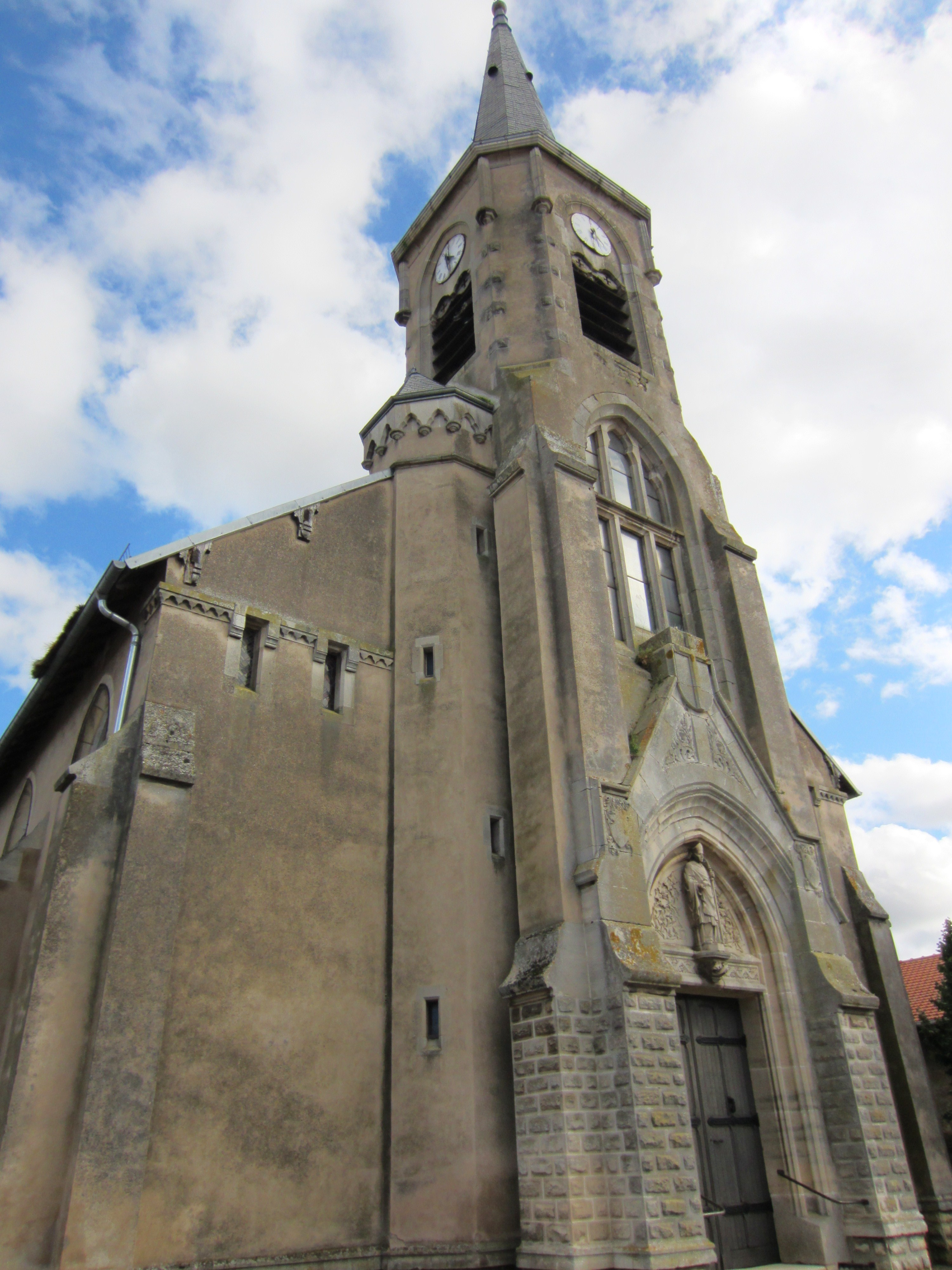
- The church in Chambley

- Coat of arms
- Location of Chambley-Bussières
- Location within France Location within Grand Est
- Coordinates: 49°02′57″N 5°53′58″E
- Country: France
- Region: Grand Est
- Department: Meurthe-et-Moselle
- Arrondissement: Toul
- Canton: Jarny
- Intercommunality: Mad et Moselle

Government
  - Mayor (2020–2026): Sébastien Berrois
- Area^{1}: 19.25 km^{2} (7.43 sq mi)
- Elevation: 258 m (846 ft)
- Highest elevation: 312 m (1,024 ft)
- Lowest elevation: 222 m (728 ft)
- Population (2023): 729
  - Density: 37.9/km^{2} (98.1/sq mi)
- Time zone: UTC+01:00 (CET)
  - Summer (DST): UTC+02:00 (CEST)
- INSEE/Postal code: 54112 /54890
- ^{1} French Land Register data, which excludes lakes, ponds, glaciers > 1 km^{2} (0.386 sq mi or 247 acres) and river estuaries.

Chambley-Bussières (French pronunciation: [ʃɑ̃blɛ bysjɛʁ]) is a commune in the Meurthe-et-Moselle department in north-eastern France.

Chambley-Bussières Air Base is located here.

== See also ==
- Communes of the Meurthe-et-Moselle department
- Parc naturel régional de Lorraine

== Sources ==
- Des villages de Cassini aux communes d'aujourd'hui: Commune data sheet Chambley-Bussières, EHESS (in French).
- lannuaire.service-public.fr: Mairie de Chambley-Bussières (in French)
