= Mondelange =

- Commune
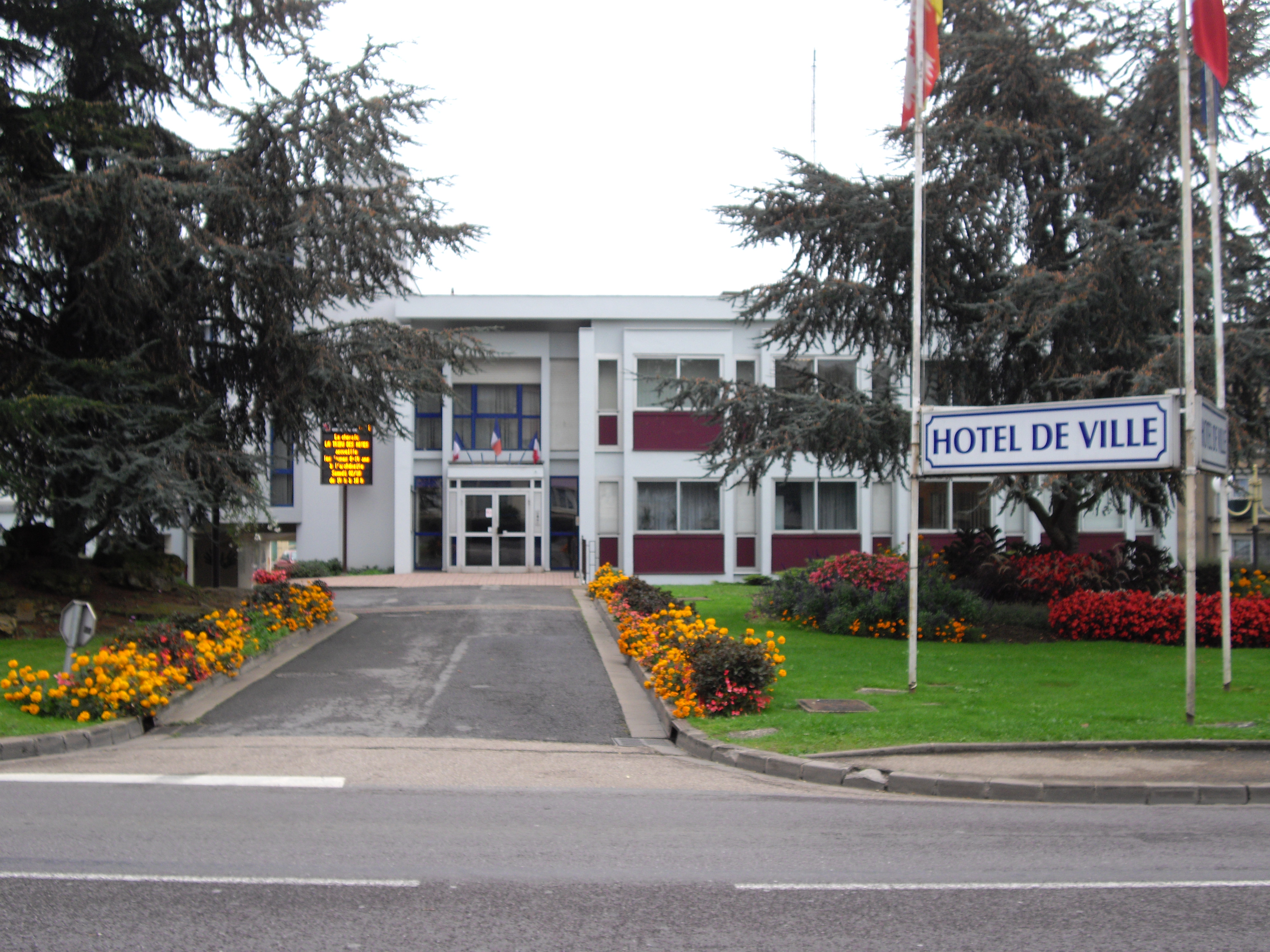
- The town hall in Mondelange

- Coat of arms
- Location of Mondelange
- Location within France Location within Grand Est
- Coordinates: 49°15′48″N 6°10′10″E
- Country: France
- Region: Grand Est
- Department: Moselle
- Arrondissement: Thionville
- Canton: Fameck
- Intercommunality: CC Rives de Moselle

Government
  - Mayor (2020–2026): Rémy Sadocco
- Area^{1}: 4.1 km^{2} (1.6 sq mi)
- Elevation: 212 m (696 ft)
- Highest elevation: 162 m (531 ft)
- Lowest elevation: 154 m (505 ft)
- Population (2023): 5,699
  - Density: 1,400/km^{2} (3,600/sq mi)
- Time zone: UTC+01:00 (CET)
  - Summer (DST): UTC+02:00 (CEST)
- INSEE/Postal code: 57474 /57300
- ^{1} French Land Register data, which excludes lakes, ponds, glaciers > 1 km^{2} (0.386 sq mi or 247 acres) and river estuaries.

Mondelange (French pronunciation: [mɔ̃dlɑ̃ʒ]; German: Mondelingen) is a commune in the Moselle department in Grand Est in north-eastern France.

== Population ==
Historical population
| Year | Pop. | ±% p.a. |
|---|---|---|
| 1968 | 6,470 | — |
| 1975 | 6,510 | +0.09% |
| 1982 | 5,993 | −1.18% |
| 1990 | 5,808 | −0.39% |
| 1999 | 5,610 | −0.38% |
| 2007 | 5,802 | +0.42% |
| 2012 | 5,999 | +0.67% |
| 2017 | 5,665 | −1.14% |
| 2023 | 5,699 | +0.10% |
Source: INSEE

== See also ==
- Communes of the Moselle department
