= Fort de Plappeville =

- Part of Séré de Rivières system, Fortifications of Metz
- France

Site information
- Type: Fort
- Controlled by: France
- Condition: Abandoned

Location
- Coordinates: 49.13374°N 6.11651°E

Site history
- Built: 1868
- Materials: Brick, stone, concrete
- Battles/wars: Battle of Metz

The Fort de Plappeville, or Feste Alvensleben, is a military fortification located to the northwest of Metz in the commune of Plappeville. As part of the first ring of the fortifications of Metz, it is an early example of a Séré de Rivières system fort. While it did not see action during World War I, it was the scene of heavy fighting between American forces and German defenders at the end of the Battle of Metz, in 1944. After Second World War it became a training center for the French Air Force. Fort 'Alvensleben' has been abandoned since 1995.

== Construction and renovations ==
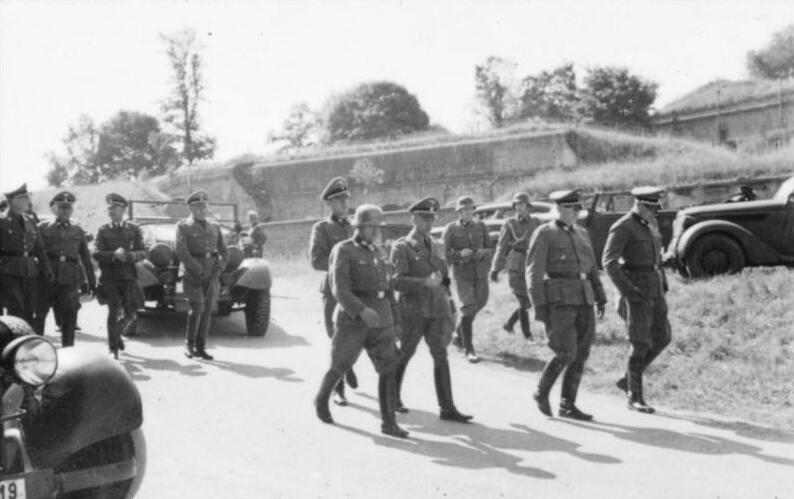
Fort de Plappeville : Inspection by Himmler and officers, 7 September 1940

The Fort de Plappeville is part of the first ring of the Metz fortifications, built during the Second Empire by Napoleon III. The works began in 1867. It was designed by Raymond Adolphe Séré de Rivières, who oversaw the initial stages of the Metz fortifications. The fort was not complete in 1870 when war was declared between France and Germany. The defensive system would be completed and improved by German engineers between 1871 and 1898. The fort mounted about 100 guns and had a garrison of about 1600 men. Half-buried in a slope, the fort dominates the valley of the Moselle. Conceived to resist distant artillery fire, it also has a system of ditches evocative of the fortifications of Vauban. The fort resembles the contemporary Fort de Queuleu and the Fort de Saint-Julien, using a bastioned layout that would be quickly superseded in forts begun a few years later. The fort's barracks differ from those at Saint-Quentin and Queleu, and are located under the artillery platform of cavalier. Batteries on the Plappeville plateau, equipped with artillery turrets, complete the defense of the principal fort. Two of the most important armored batteries have four armored turrets with 150mm guns.

A powder explosion in 1871 caused extensive damage to the barracks and required their reconstruction. Armored observation points were installed in 1885.

=== First World War ===
During the annexation of Alsace-Lorraine by Germany, the fort was renamed Feste Alvensleben and became a training camp for Prussian officers. From 1914 to 1918 it was used as a rest station for soldiers traveling along the front, particularly from Verdun. Its military equipment was upgraded to the standards current at the time. In November 1918, the fort was reoccupied by the French army.

=== Second World War ===
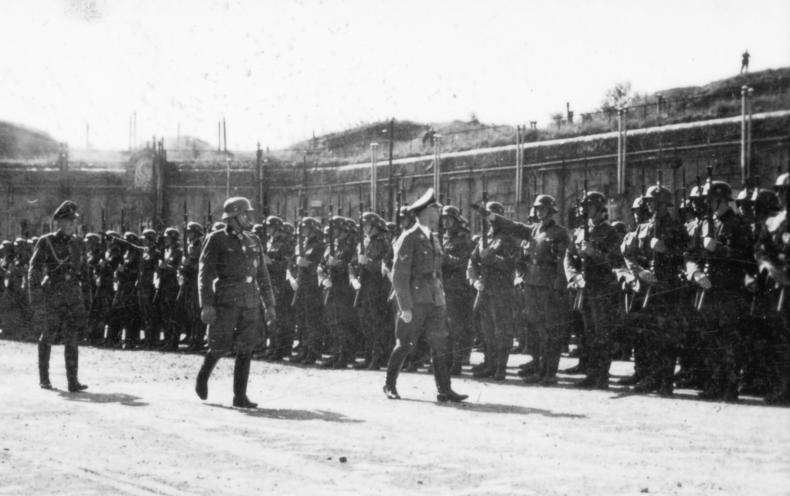
Fort de Plappeville : Review of the 1st SS Division by Himmler

After the armistice of 1940 the fort was occupied by German forces. On 7 September Heinrich Himmler reviewed the troops of the 1st SS Division ( Leibstandarte Adolf Hitler) in the fort's place d'armes. The occasion was the presentation of a new standard to the SS formation, organized for the visit of the Reichsführer to Metz at the request of General Sepp Dietrich. The fort later became a disciplinary camp for the Wehrmacht. At the beginning of September 1944 the fort's defense was reorganized and integrated into the defense of Metz.

Like the Fort du Mont Saint-Quentin, Fort Driant and Fort Jeanne d'Arc, the Fort de Plappeville first saw combat between September and November 1944 during the Battle of Metz. The Fort de Plappeville, placed under the command of Colonel Vogel of the artillery, as well as Fort du Mont Saint Quentin, commanded by Colonel von Stossel, provided mutual artillery support and impeded the American advance along the valley of the Moselle to the west of Metz. During the Battle of Metz the buried fortifications resisted American artillery attack well, particularly attacks with incendiary weapons. The forts fell after a series of violent assaults. Encircled by the 378th Regiment of the U.S. 95th Infantry Division, the Fort de Plappeville repelled a number of attacks. Colonel Vogel asked for a truce to evacuate his wounded, but refused to surrender. The Fort de Plappeville surrendered on 8 December 1944, with 200 men to the U.S. 5th Infantry Division, two weeks after the surrender of German troops in Metz.

After the Second World War, in 1949, the fort was transferred to the French air force and became a military instruction center for new recruits at Metz-Frescaty Air Base. Abandoned since 1995, the fort has been vandalized.
