= Hans Alexis von Biehler =

Prussian general (1818–1886)

- Born: 16 June 1818; Berlin
- Died: 30 December 1886 (aged 68); Charlottenburg
- Military career
- Allegiance: (Kingdom of Prussia) Prussia
- Branch: Prussian Army

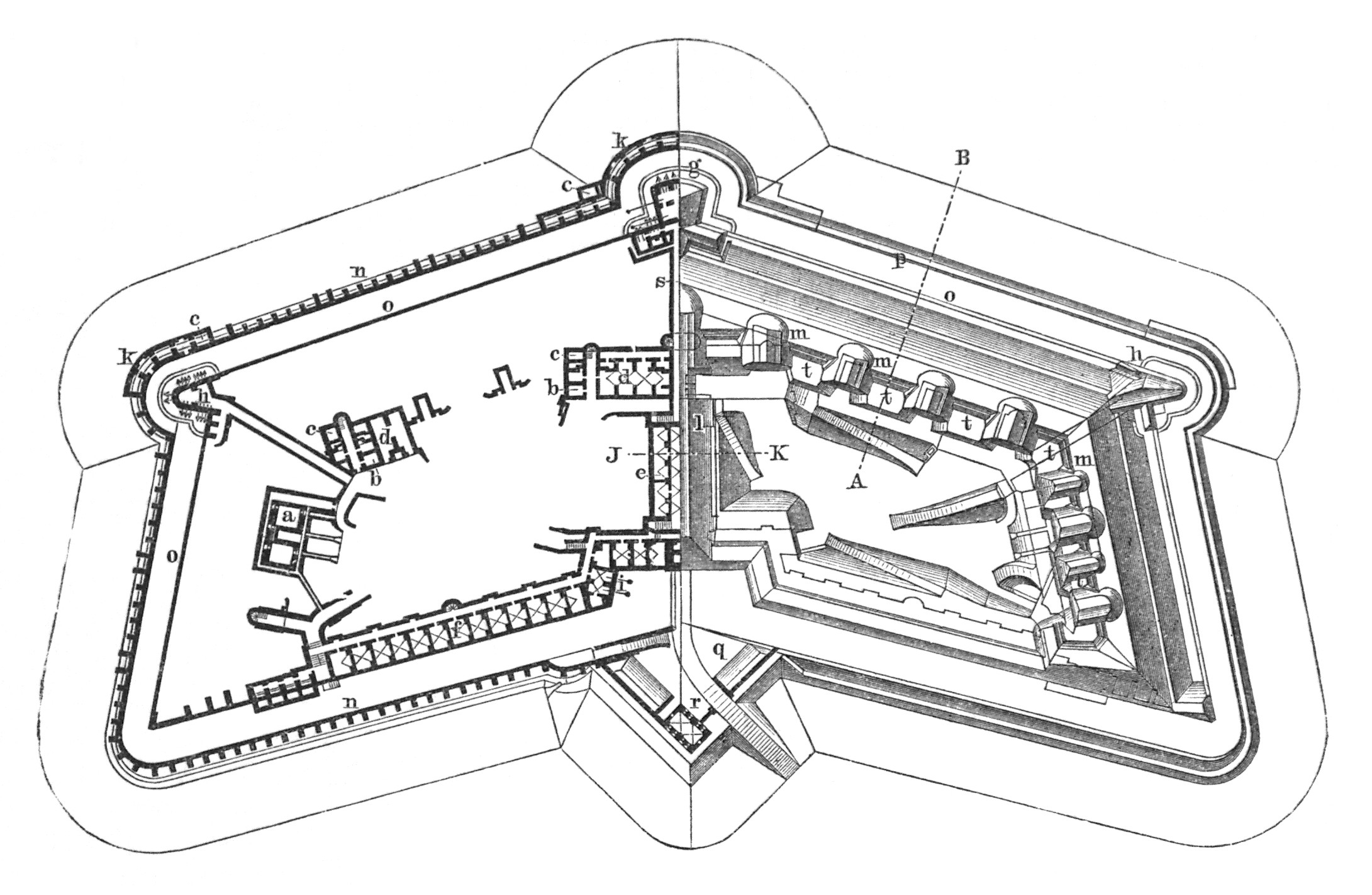
Standard model of Biehler's fort

Hans Alexis von Biehler (16 June 1818 – 30 December 1886) was a Prussian general. He designed fortifications in many famous locations. Beginning in 1873, he saw fort construction in Cologne, Strasbourg, Poznań, Toruń, Königsberg, Ingolstadt, Metz, Kostrzyn, Spandau, Ulm, Mainz and Magdeburg.

== Awards and decorations ==
- Iron Cross of 1870
  - 2nd Class
  - 1st Class (2 December 1870)
- Order of the Iron Crown, First Class (18 December 1877)
- Grand Cross of the Military Merit Order (Bavaria, 27 November 1877)
- Order of the Red Eagle, 1st Class with Oak Leaves (26 January 1879)
- Grand Cross of the Order of the Württemberg Crown (19 June 1879)
- Grand Officer of the Order of Aviz (25 November 1880)
- Grand Cross of the Albert Order (25 November 1880)
