= Fortifications of Metz =

Coordinates: 49°07′04″N 6°11′08″E

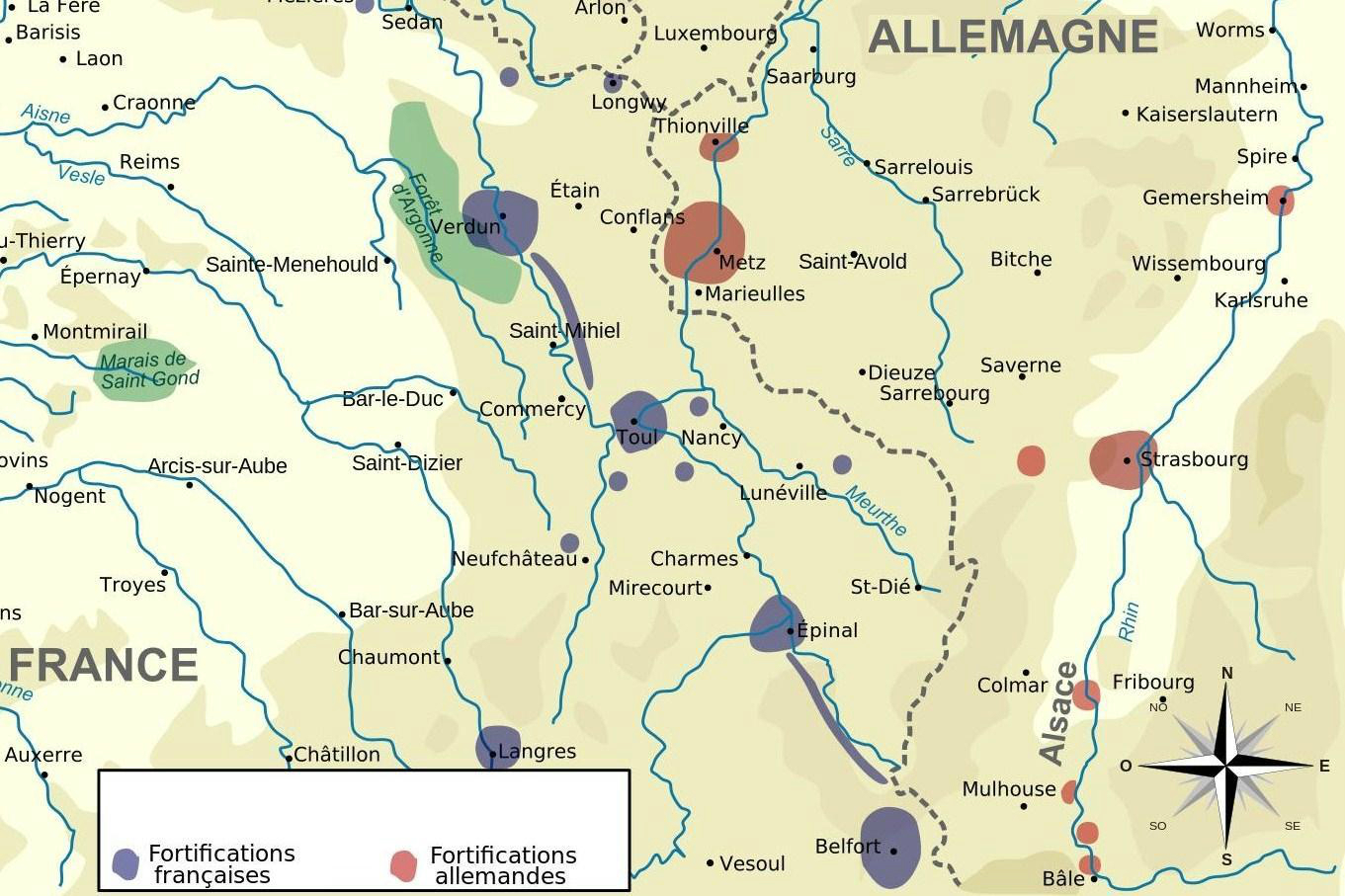
Franco-German border, 1914

The fortifications of Metz, a city in northeastern France, are extensive, due to the city's strategic position near the border of France and Germany. After the Franco-Prussian War of 1870, the area was annexed by the newly created German Empire in 1871 by the Treaty of Frankfurt and became the Reichsland Alsace–Lorraine. The German Army decided to build a fortress line from Mulhouse to Luxembourg to protect their new territories. The centerpiece of this line was the Moselstellung between Metz and Thionville, in Lorraine.

== Overview ==
The fortifications around Metz consisted of casemates, concrete barracks, infantry strong points, and concrete batteries, equipped with rotating steel turrets (100–150 mm). Each position was surrounded by several ditches, or concrete trenches, with shelters and observation cupolas. A large barbed wire belt, defended by machine gun and rifle positions, completed the defensive system.

Forts had usually several large blockhouse style barracks. These had 3-meter thick reinforced concrete roofs with 2-meter thick walls. They were partially buried under as much as 6 m (20 ft) of compacted earth. Tunnels connected all of the structures. The fort also had deep wide trenches, some as much as 9 m (30 ft) in both dimensions. They were also surrounded by a thick layer of barbed wire entanglements.

Each fort had 2–4 batteries, equipped with hydraulic rotating steel turrets (100–150 mm). In the summer of 1944, only 10% of the batteries were fully operational. Most of those were in Fort Driant (Feste Kronprinz) and Fort Jeanne d'Arc (Feste Kaiserin). By November, during the battle of Metz, the German troops had managed to get about 50% of the guns operational in most of the forts listed below. These batteries were lacking range tables, missing sights and other equipment to make the guns fully operational.

Below is a list of the fortifications that exist around the area of Metz. Because they switched hands quite often, the French names are listed as well as any applicable German ones. In parentheses is the construction period.

== Forts of the first belt ==
The first, inner belt of fortifications were completed by the French just prior to the Franco-Prussian War and were in service during the Siege of Metz from 3 September to 23 October 1870. The forts were in a ring approximately 4 km out from the city center, and were (anti-clockwise from the south):

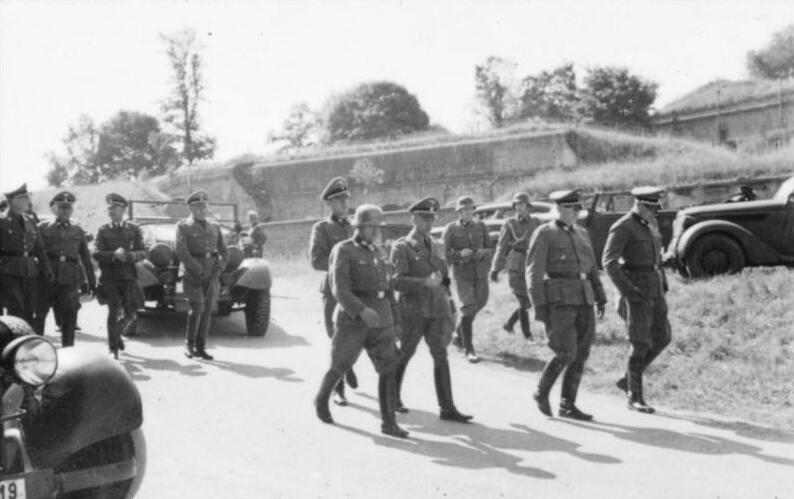
Fort de Plappeville / Fort Alvensleben, September 7, 1940

- Fort de Saint-Privat (1870) / Fort Prinz August von Württemberg (1872–1875)
- Fort de Queuleu (1867–1870) / Fort Goeben (1871–1890)
- Fort des Bordes (1870) / Fort Zastrow (1874–1875)
- Fort de Saint-Julien (1867–1870) / Fort Manteuffel (1871–1891)
- Fort Gambetta / Fort Hindersin (1879–1881)
- Fort Déroulède / Fort Kameke (1876–1879)
- Fort Decaen / Fort Schwerin (1878–1880)
- Fort de Plappeville (1867–1870) / Fort Alvensleben (1871–1891)
- Groupe fortifié du Mont Saint-Quentin (1867–1870) / Feste Prinz Friedrich-Karl (1872–1892)
  - Fort Diou (1867–1870) / Ostfort (1872–1892)
  - Fort Girardin / Fort Manstein (1872–1892)

== Forts of the second belt ==
The second, outer belt of fortifications were completed by the Germans prior to the First World War but saw little service. Prior to the Second World War they were incorporated by the French into the Maginot Line defenses, but again saw little action. In October 1944, while occupied by the Germans, the fortifications were assaulted and captured by the American 3rd Army in the Battle of Metz. The forts were in an offset ring from 8–10 km from the city, and were (anticlockwise from the south):

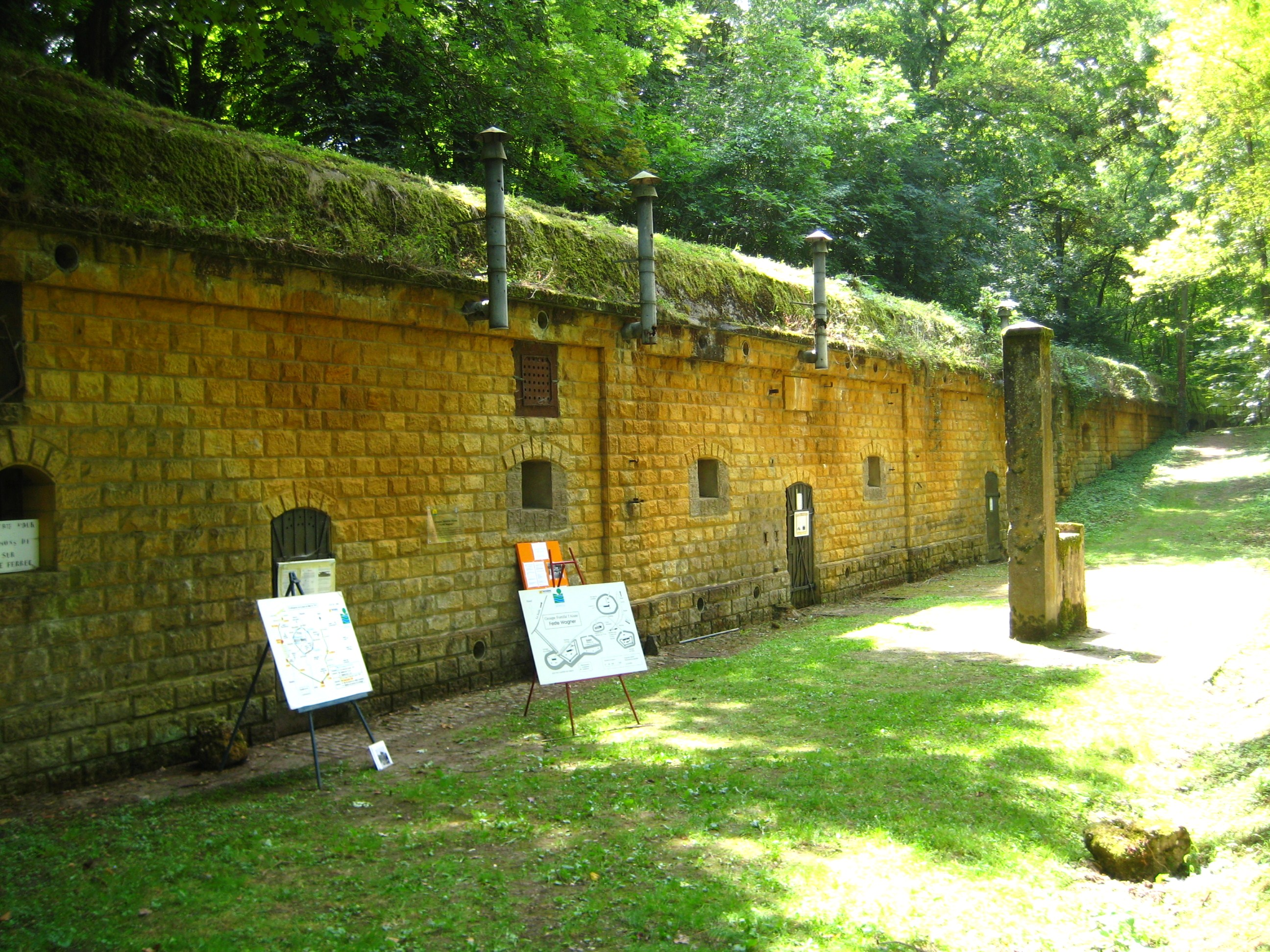
Fort l’Aisne (Feste Wagner), 1904-1912

- Fort l’Aisne / Feste Wagner (1904–1912)
- Fort l’Yser / Feste Prinzregent Luitpold (1907–1914)
- Fort La Marne / Feste Generalfeldmarschall Freiherr von der Goltz (1907–1916)

(anticlockwise from the north):

- Fort Lorraine / Feste Lothringen (1899–1905)
- Fort François de Guise / Feste Leipzig (1907–1912)
- Fort Jeanne d'Arc / Feste Kaiserin (1899–1905)
- Fort Driant / Feste Kronprinz (1899–1905)
- Fort Verdun / Feste Haeseler (1899–1905), sometimes referred to as Feste Graf Haeseler

== The "seven dwarfs" ==
These are a series of small defensive emplacements built between 1912 and 1916 in a line between Driant and Jeanne d'Arc. The name for them was created by the Americans of the U.S. Third Army during the Battle of Metz in the Second World War. They are sometimes (mistakenly) referred to as forts, and their name alludes to their weak defensive strength. From south to north they are:

- Marival bunker
- Vaux Southern point of support
- Vaux Northern point of support
- Bois-la-Dame ('Lady's Wood') bunker
- Jussy Southern point of support
- Jussy Northern point of support
- Saint Hubert point of support

== See also ==
- Fortified Region of Metz for the Maginot Line fortifications shielding the Metz industrial region
- List of fortifications
- Mont Saint-Quentin in Moselle Valley
