= Fort de Queuleu =

- Part of Séré de Rivières system, Fortifications of Metz
- France
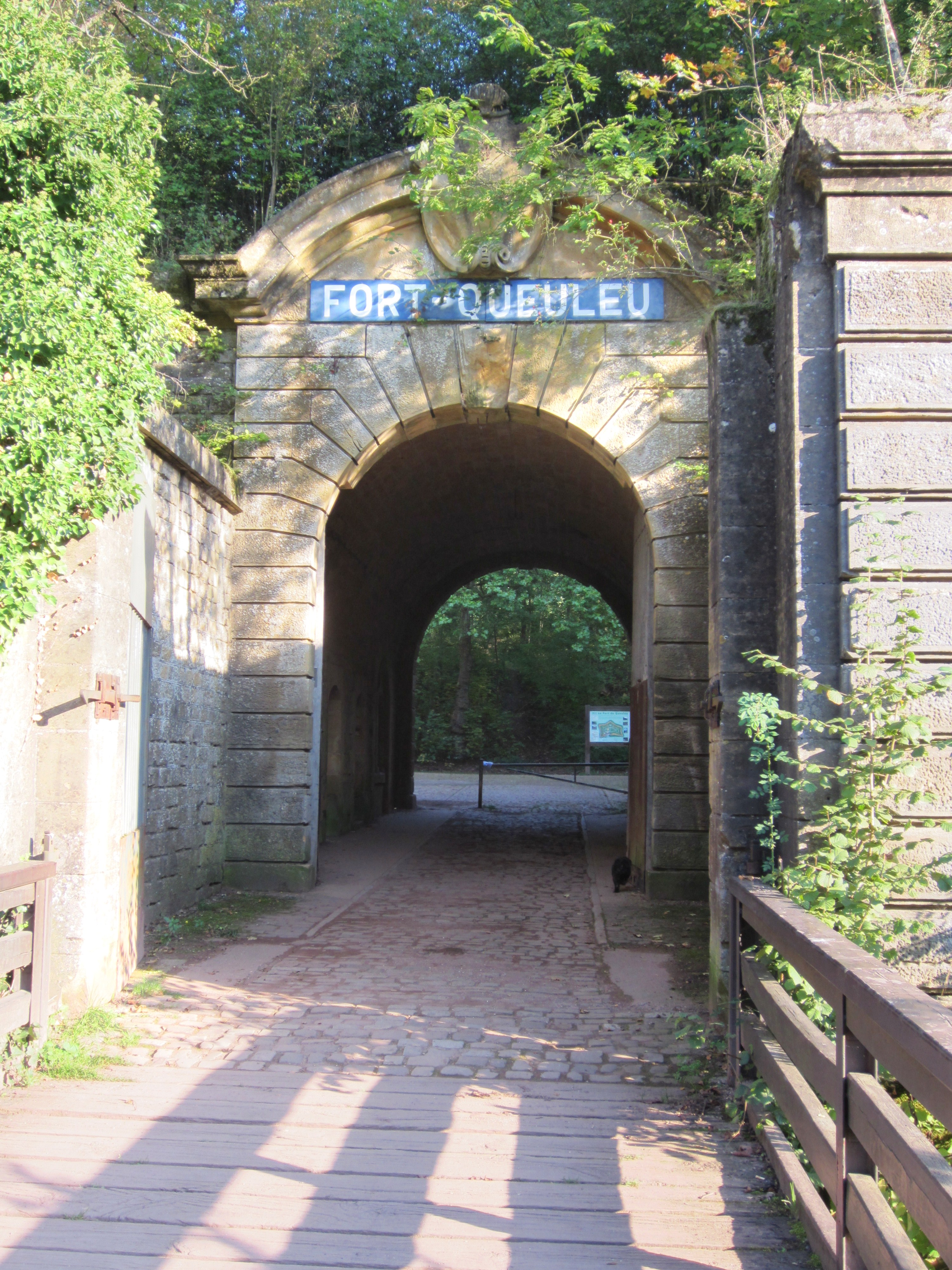

Site information
- Type: Fort
- Owner: City of Metz
- Controlled by: France
- Open to the public: Yes, surface
- Condition: Abandoned

Location
- Coordinates: 49.09558°N 6.20367°E

Site history
- Built: 1868
- Materials: Brick, stone, concrete
- Battles/wars: Battle of Metz

The Fort de Queuleu (French pronunciation: [fɔʁ də kølø]) is a fortification to the southeast of Metz, near Queuleu, France. Construction began while part of Lorraine was under French rule in 1868. After the interruption of the Franco-Prussian War of 1870-71, the fort was improved between 1872 and 1875 by the German Empire, which had conquered the area in the war. Renamed Fort Goeben, it formed part of the first ring of the fortifications of Metz. Functionally obsolete by the First World War, it saw no military action, but was used by the Germans as a detention center for members of the French Resistance during World War II.

== Context ==
The fort was one of the first built according to the fortification system developed by Lieutenant Colonel Raymond Adolphe Séré de Rivières. The goal was to build a discontinuous enclosure around Metz using a series of artillery forts spaced a cannonshot apart. In the 1860s tension was rising between France and Germany, causing France to attend to the fortification of its frontiers. Metz, close to the border and a strategic road and rail crossing, was the beneficiary of one of the first programs of fortification. Before all of the forts could be completed, France was defeated in the Franco-Prussian War and the area around Metz was annexed to Germany. Metz then became a crucial strongpoint on Germany's frontier, receiving sustained attention to its defenses that culminated in the Moselstellung of the early twentieth century.

The pre-war French construction program comprised eight forts surrounding Metz at a distance of 3.5 - 5.5 km from the center of the city. Planning began in 1864, and in 1867 the project was placed under the supervision of Séré de Rivières. Compared with later Séré de Rivières system forts, the fort's design is reminiscent of the bastioned enclosures of Vauban of the 18th century. In their developed form, the Séré de Rivières forts of the 1870s were much simplified in plan, with less overt reference to historic prototypes.

Casemates were arranged on two levels. As constructed, a large proportion of the fort's artillery was placed on the surface of the fort, exposed to high-angle artillery fire. This was not considered a major disadvantage in the 1860s, when most opposing artillery was expected to be smooth-bored guns firing solid shot or gunpowder-filled shells on a low trajectory, with the aim of battering the walls of the fort so that breaches could be exploited by infantry. During the 1870s rifled guns came into widespread use, making exposed masonry walls dangerously vulnerable. At the same time, fuses were developed that enabled shells fired at a high angle from howitzers or mortars to explode in the air above an open position, making exposed fixed-position artillery untenable. Fort de Queuleu was thus already obsolete when it was taken over by the Germans.

The fort's construction was improved under the German Empire, which renamed it Fort Goeben after a Prussian general who had distinguished himself at the Battle of Spicheren on 6 August 1870. Immediate German construction focused on dispersing gun batteries to flanking positions and reinforcing protection for personnel and ammunition against shellfire. In 1885, new explosives led to a massive increase in the explosive power of artillery projectiles, the so-called crise de l'obus-torpille ("torpedo-shell crisis). This development made unprotected artillery and masonry construction entirely obsolete, as the new shells could easily destroy masonry structures. In response, concrete and earth sheltering was employed in new forts, and older forts were reinforced under the new principles. In 1885 a program of reinforcement covered some critical areas of Queuleu with concrete and provided better infantry shelters. As an early fort, Queuleu has relatively few underground passages compared to the Moselstellung forts of the 1890s, but does feature countermine passages extending from the front of the fort.

== History ==
While the Moselle valley was under German control during World War II the fort was used starting in 1943 by the German occupiers as an internment camp (S Sonderlager) for members of the French Resistance, including Joseph Derhan. The fort was called the "Hell of Queuleu" (Enfer de Queuleu). It was not a concentration camp, but an interrogation center for captured or arrested members of the Resistance, commanded by Schutzstaffel Hauptscharführer Georg Friedrich Hempen (* 27.07.1905). Between 1500 and 1800 people were detained at Queuleu. Prisoners were held in Casemate A of the fort. Thirty-six died there and four escaped through a ventilation shaft. Among the most notable prisoners were the Mario Group of resisters, led by Jean Burger. Almost all of the prisoners were transferred to concentration camps as American forces approached Metz in late 1944. The Germans evacuated the fort on 17 August 1944 and moved the majority of the detainees to Struthof, Schirmeck or Ravensbrück.

Georg Hempen was tried and sentenced in absentia to death. He was arrested in 1962 while working as a police officer in Oldenburg, Germany. After a lengthy trial, he was acquitted on technical grounds.

== Present situation ==
A memorial to the Resistance and Deportation, designed by architect R. Zonca, was inaugurated on 20 November 1977, when the fort became the property of the city of Metz. It had been designated a historical monument in 1971. The fort is open to the public at scheduled times.

== Bibliography ==
- Léon Burger, Tragédies mosellanes, le fort de Queuleu à Metz, 1973, Metz. (in French)
- Léon Burger, En Moselle, Résistance et tragédies pendant la deuxième guerre mondiale, 1976, Metz. (Léon Burger was the brother of Jean Burger, chief of the Mario resistance group.)
- Claudia Moisel: Frankreich und die Kriegsverbrecher; Wallstein-Verlag Göttingen 2004
