= Ouvrage Bois-Karre =

Ouvrage of the Maginot Line

- Part of Maginot Line
- Northeast France
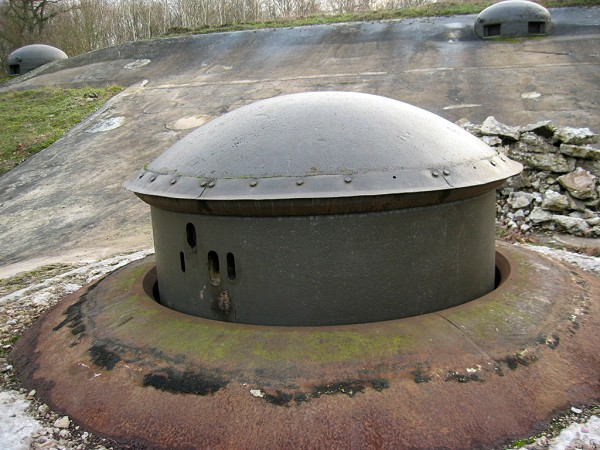
- Machine gun turret — note two GFM cloches to the rear

Site information
- Controlled by: France
- Open to the public: Yes
- Condition: Preserved

Location
- Location within France
- Coordinates: 49.429822°N 6.204173°E

Site history
- Built by: CORF
- Materials: Concrete, steel, deep excavation
- Battles/wars: Battle of France, Lorraine Campaign

Ouvrage Bois-Karre is located in the Fortified Sector of Thionville of the Maginot Line, facing the France - Luxembourg border. The petit ouvrage is situated in the Cattenom Forest between the gros ouvrages Soetrich and Kobenbusch, just south of Boust. It is unusual for a Maginot fortification in its construction as a single blockhouse, with no underground gallery system or remotely located entries. Bois-Karre has been preserved and is maintained as a museum.

== Design and construction ==
Bois-Karre was surveyed by CORF (Commission d'Organisation des Régions Fortifiées), the Maginot Line's design and construction agency, in 1930. Work by the contractor Degaine-Dubois began in 1931, and the position became operational in 1935, at a cost of 10 million francs.

Bois-Karre was planned as an anchor point for a fortified line of retreat from the Cattenom salient formed by Kobenbusch and Oberheid. A firing chamber is arranged to cover the reinforcing line (bretelle de Cattenom), which was to be anchored at its other end by Block 2 of Ouvrage Galgenberg. The reinforcing line was never built.

== Description ==
The single two-level combat block comprises two firing chambers and one machine gun turret. The west firing chamber was armed with a machine gun embrasure and a machine gun/47 mm anti-tank gun embrasure (JM/AC47). The east firing chamber was equipped with two JM/AC47 embrasures and a JM embrasure. Three automatic rifle cloches (GFM) on the surface provided spotting for ouvrage Métrich, along with a machine gun turret. The integral usine was equipped with two 40 horsepower (30 kW) Renault engines.

Several casemates, observatories and infantry shelters are located around Bois-Karre, including

- Casemate de Basse-Parthe Ouest: Single classmate flanking to the west with one JM/AC37 embrasure, one JM embrasure and one GFM cloche.
- Casemate de Basse-Parthe Est: Single classmate flanking to the east with one JM/AC37 embrasure, one JM embrasure and one GFM cloche.
- Abri du Bois-Karre: Surface shelter for one infantry section, with two GFM cloches.
- Abri du Rippert: Subsurface shelter for two infantry sections and the quarter command post, two GFM cloches.
- Abri du Bois-de-Cattenom: Surface shelter for one infantry section, two GFM cloches.

None of these are connected to the ouvrage or to each other. All were built by CORF. The Casernement de Cattenom provided peacetime above-ground barracks and support services to Bois-Karre and other ouvrages in the area.

== Manning ==
The garrison comprised 91 men and two officers of the 168th Fortress Infantry Regiment under Sub-Lieutenant Boulay.

== History ==
See Fortified Sector of Thionville for a broader discussion of the events of 1940 in the Thionville sector of the Maginot Line.

== Current condition ==
The ouvrage which retains a large portion of its equipment, has been restored and may be visited.

== See also ==
- List of all works on Maginot Line
- Siegfried Line
- Atlantic Wall
- Czechoslovak border fortifications

== Bibliography ==
- Allcorn, William. The Maginot Line 1928–45. Oxford: Osprey Publishing, 2003. ISBN 1-84176-646-1
- Degon, André; Zylberyng, Didier, La Ligne Maginot: Guide des Forts à Visiter, Editions Ouest-France, 2014. ISBN 978-2-7373-6080-0 (in French)
- Kaufmann, J.E. and Kaufmann, H.W. Fortress France: The Maginot Line and French Defenses in World War II, Stackpole Books, 2006. ISBN 0-275-98345-5
- Kaufmann, J.E., Kaufmann, H.W., Jancovič-Potočnik, A. and Lang, P. The Maginot Line: History and Guide, Pen and Sword, 2011. ISBN 978-1-84884-068-3
- Mary, Jean-Yves; Hohnadel, Alain; Sicard, Jacques. Hommes et Ouvrages de la Ligne Maginot, Tome 1. Paris, Histoire & Collections, 2001. ISBN 2-908182-88-2 (in French)
- Mary, Jean-Yves; Hohnadel, Alain; Sicard, Jacques. Hommes et Ouvrages de la Ligne Maginot, Tome 2. Paris, Histoire & Collections, 2003. ISBN 2-908182-97-1 (in French)
- Mary, Jean-Yves; Hohnadel, Alain; Sicard, Jacques. Hommes et Ouvrages de la Ligne Maginot, Tome 3. Paris, Histoire & Collections, 2003. ISBN 2-913903-88-6 (in French)
- Mary, Jean-Yves; Hohnadel, Alain; Sicard, Jacques. Hommes et Ouvrages de la Ligne Maginot, Tome 5. Paris, Histoire & Collections, 2009. ISBN 978-2-35250-127-5 (in French)
