= Ouvrage Métrich =

Ouvrage of the Maginot Line

- Part of Maginot Line
- Northeast France
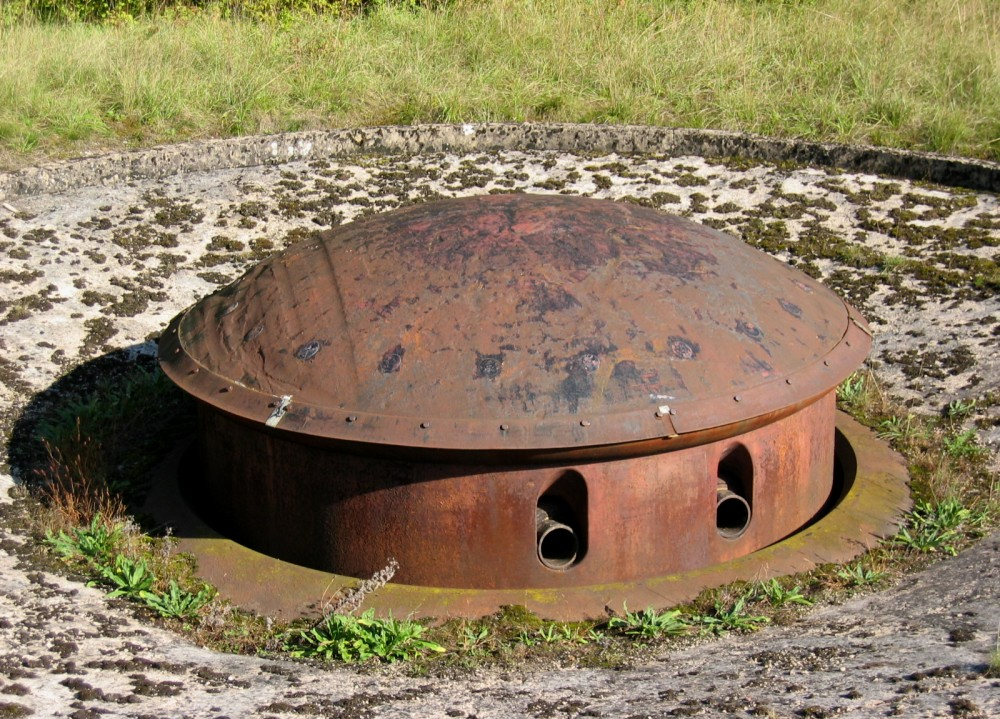
- 135mm gun turret, gros ouvrage Métrich Block 11, September 2004

Site information
- Owner: Private
- Controlled by: France

Location
- Coordinates: 49.39083°N 6.29361°E

Site history
- Built by: CORF
- In use: Abandoned
- Materials: Concrete, steel, deep excavation
- Battles/wars: Battle of France, Lorraine Campaign

Ouvrage Métrich located in the village of Kœnigsmacker in Moselle, comprises part of the Elzange portion of the Fortified Sector of Thionville of the Maginot Line. A gros ouvrage, it is the third largest of the Line, after Hackenberg and Hochwald. It lies between petit ouvrage Sentzich and gros ouvrage Billig, facing Germany. Located to the east of the Moselle, it cooperated with Ouvrage Galgenberg to control the river valley.

== Design and construction ==
Métrich was approved for construction by CORF (Commission d'Organisation des Régions Fortifiées), the Maginot Line's design and construction agency, in November 1930 and became operational by 1935, at a cost of 127 million francs. The contractor was Construction Générale.

== Description ==
Métrich is a typical large Maginot gros ouvrage (Note: English-language sources use the French term ouvrage as the preferred term for the Maginot positions, in preference to "fort", a term usually reserved for older fortifications with passive defensives in the form of walls and ditches. The literal translation of ouvrage in the sense of a fortification in English is "work." A gros ouvrage is a large fortification with a significant artillery component, while a petit ouvrage is smaller, with lighter arms.) with separate ammunition and personnel entry blocks. It has a particularly heavy artillery component, with seven 75 mm guns, two 135 mm guns and four 81 mm mortars, making it the third most heavily armed unit in the Maginot Line. More than 1,200 metres (3,900 ft) of underground galleries connect the entries to the farthest blocks 4 and 5, at an average depth of 30 metres (98 ft). An "M1" magazine, arranged with a horseshoe-shaped perimeter gallery connected by cross galleries between the legs, is located close to the ammunition entrance, while the underground barracks and utility areas are just inside the personnel entry. The gallery system was served by a narrow gauge (60 cm) railway that continued out the ammunition entry and connected to a regional military railway system for the movement of materiel along the front a few kilometres to the rear. Several "stations" along the gallery system, located in wider sections of the gallery, permitted trains to pass or be stored. Several 60 cm wagons, which had remained at Métrich, were recovered in 1983 and were moved to the Maginot museum at Ouvrage Schoenenbourg.

Ouvrage Métrich comprises two entries and ten combat blocks:

- Ammunition entry: at-grade, one machine gun/37 mm anti-tank gun embrasure (JM/AC37), one machine gun embrasure (JM), and two automatic rifle cloches (GFM).
- Personnel entry: gently descending from the entry, one JM/AC37 embrasure, one JM embrasure, and two GFM cloches.
- Block 1: Artillery block flanking to the north with three 75 mm gun embrasures and two GFM cloches.
- Block 3: Infantry block flanking to the north with one machine gun turret, one JM/AC37 embrasure, one JM embrasure and one GFM cloche
- Block 4: Infantry block with one machine gun turret
- Block 5: Artillery block with one 81 mm mortar turret and two GFM cloches
- Block 7: Observation block with one GFM cloche and one VDP periscope cloche.
- Block 8: Mixed block with one 75 mm gun turret, one JM/AC37 embrasure, one JM embrasure and two GFM cloches
- Block 10: Artillery block with one 75 mm gun terret and one grenade launcher turret (LG).
- Block 11: Artillery block with one 135 mm gun turret, one grenade launcher turret and one GFM cloche.
- Block 14: Observation block with two GFM cloches and one periscope cloche (VDP).
- Block 15: Artillery block with two 81 mm mortar embrasures and two GFM cloches.

Due to the depth of the main galleries under the height of the Métrich Hill, blocks 8 and 11 are linked by a gallery at an intermediate level, containing an "M2" magazine. An intermediate level under Block 7 contains the command post.

=== Casemates and shelters ===
Métrich was associated with a number of smaller fortifications. These included:

- Casemate de Koenigsmacker Nord: one JM/AC37 embrasure, one JM embrasure, one GFM cloche
- Casemate de Koenigsmacker Sud: one JM/AC37 embrasure, one JM embrasure, one GFM cloche
- Casemate de Métrich Nord: one JM/AC47 embrasure, one JM embrasure, one GFM cloche
- Casemate de Métrich Sud: one JM/AC47 embrasure, one JM embrasure, one GFM cloche
- Abri du Krekelbusch: buried infantry shelter for two sections, with one GFM cloche (Note: An abri is an infantry shelter, sometimes underground or under earth cover. An abri in the main Maginot Line often closely resembles a casemate, but is more lightly armed and can hold more occupants.)
- Abri Sud de Métrich: buried infantry shelter for one section, with two GFM cloches
- Abri du Nonnenberg: buried infantry shelter for one section, with two GFM cloches
- Abri du Nord-du-Bichel: surface infantry shelter for one section, with two GFM cloches
- Casemate du Bois-de-Koenigsmacker: one JM/AC37 embrasure, one JM embrasure, two GFM cloches
- Abri du Sud-du-Bichel: surface infantry shelter for one section, with two GFM cloches, in the process of restoration.

None of these are connected to the ouvrage or to each other. All were built by CORF.

== Manning ==
The ouvrage was manned by 795 men and 26 officers under the command of Commandant Lauga. The Casernement d'Elzange provided peacetime above-ground barracks and support services to Bois-Karre and other ouvrages in the area.

== History ==
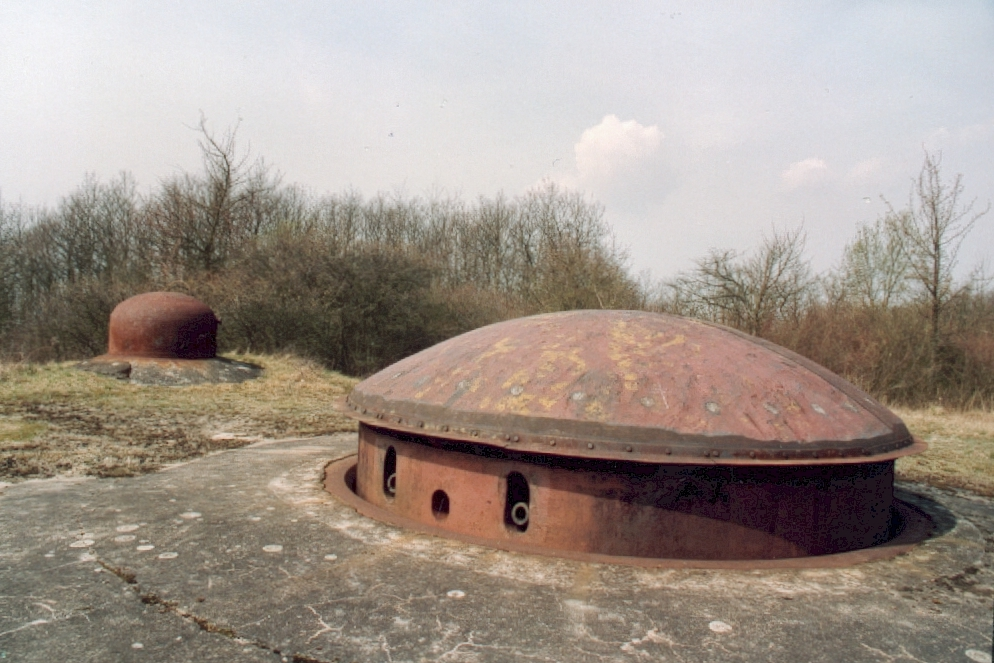
75 mm turret with GFM cloche behind

See Fortified Sector of Thionville for a broader discussion of the events of 1940 in the Thionville sector of the Maginot Line.

The principal mission of the ouvrage was to cover the east side of the Moselle Valley. In 1940 German forces largely bypassed the Moselle, enveloping Thionville from the rear. Métrich and other ouvrages in the Thionville sector therefore surrendered after the Second Armistice at Compiègne of 22 June. During the Occupation support areas of the ouvrage were transformed by German occupiers into offices and manufacturing facilities. Some of the combat blocks were used by the Germans for testing of explosives. In 1944 Métrich was held by the 74th Volksgrenadier Regiment of the 19th Volksgrenadier Division. Métrich was attacked on 10 November 1944 by the U.S. 90th Infantry Division advancing around the north side of Thionville. After an initial retreat, German resistance was strong. A second, cautious assault was launched on the 11th, and when the ouvrage had been surrounded the main force bypassed the position, leaving a holding force to clear the German defences, where resistance ended on the 12th.

Following the war, the Maginot Line was viewed as a means of slowing an advance by Warsaw Pact forces and most of the north-eastern positions were renovated and rearmed. The renovations did not include the command post or the barracks. However, the program was abandoned, and after a period of routine maintenance, Métrich's status was lowered to inactive reserve, and finally abandoned.

== Current condition ==
Métrich has been stripped of all materials by salvagers and vandals. The ouvrage is in a state of advanced dilapidation, primarily because the soil is composed of gypsum, causing the destruction of the floors and walls of the galleries. Magazine M1 was used for the cultivation of mushrooms in 1986-87. The entries and blocks with embrasures have been covered with rubble by the Army.

The Abri du Sud-du-Bichel is under restoration by the Association mémoire des intervalles de la Ligne Maginot.

== See also ==
- List of all works on Maginot Line
- Siegfried Line
- Atlantic Wall
- Czechoslovak border fortifications

== Bibliography ==
- Allcorn, William. The Maginot Line 1928-45. Oxford: Osprey Publishing, 2003. ISBN 1-84176-646-1
- Kaufmann, J.E. and Kaufmann, H.W. Fortress France: The Maginot Line and French Defenses in World War II, Stackpole Books, 2006. ISBN 0-275-98345-5
- Kaufmann, J.E., Kaufmann, H.W., Jancovič-Potočnik, A. and Lang, P. The Maginot Line: History and Guide, Pen and Sword, 2011. ISBN 978-1-84884-068-3
- Mary, Jean-Yves; Hohnadel, Alain; Sicard, Jacques. Hommes et Ouvrages de la Ligne Maginot, Tome 1. Paris, Histoire & Collections, 2001. ISBN 2-908182-88-2 (in French)
- Mary, Jean-Yves; Hohnadel, Alain; Sicard, Jacques. Hommes et Ouvrages de la Ligne Maginot, Tome 2. Paris, Histoire & Collections, 2003. ISBN 2-908182-97-1 (in French)
- Mary, Jean-Yves; Hohnadel, Alain; Sicard, Jacques. Hommes et Ouvrages de la Ligne Maginot, Tome 3. Paris, Histoire & Collections, 2003. ISBN 2-913903-88-6 (in French)
- Mary, Jean-Yves; Hohnadel, Alain; Sicard, Jacques. Hommes et Ouvrages de la Ligne Maginot, Tome 5. Paris, Histoire & Collections, 2009. ISBN 978-2-35250-127-5 (in French)
