= Ouvrage Sentzich =

Ouvrage of the Maginot Line

- Part of Maginot Line
- North-East France
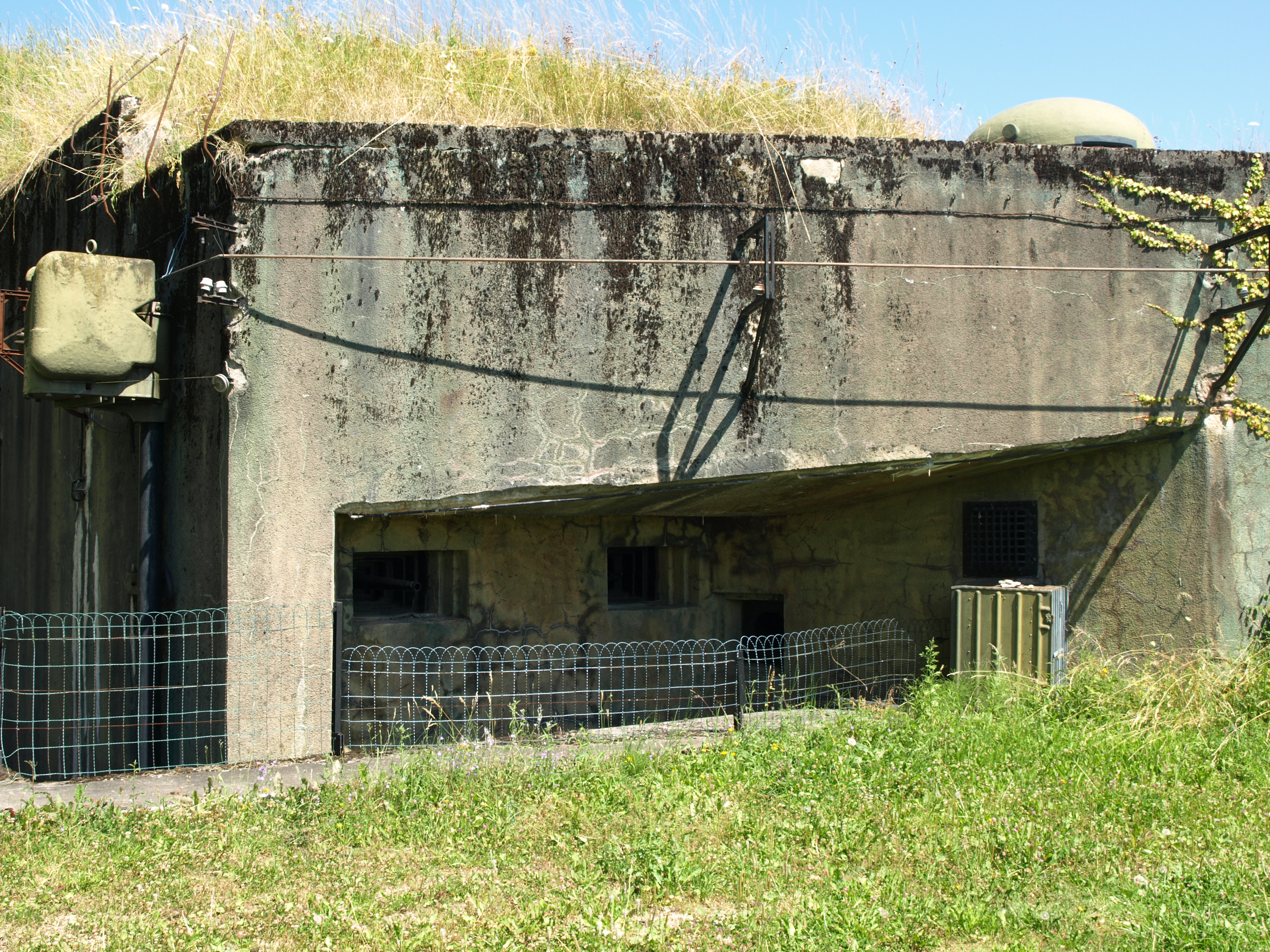
- Ouvrage Sentzich

Site information
- Controlled by: France

Location
- Coordinates: 49.42028°N 6.26056°E

Site history
- Built: 1933
- Built by: CORF
- In use: Abandoned
- Materials: Concrete, steel, deep excavation
- Battles/wars: Battle of France, Lorraine Campaign

Ouvrage Sentzich is part of the Fortified Sector of Thionville of the Maginot Line. The petit ouvrage for infantry is located to the south of gros ouvrage Galgenberg, on the edge of the main road to Luxembourg near the village of Sentzich. Gros ouvrage Métrich is to the east. As a small work, it was not considered for use after World War II and was abandoned. It is secured and is not open to the public.

== Design and construction ==
The Sentzich site was approved by CORF (Commission d'Organisation des Régions Fortifiées), the Maginot Line's design and construction agency, in February 1930 and construction by contractor Verdun-Fortifications started the same year. The construction cost was 7.5 million francs.

== Description ==
The single infantry block possessed two firing chambers and one machine gun turret. The north chamber was equipped for a machine gun/37 mm anti-tank gun combination (JM/AC37), and was surmounted by an automatic rifle cloche (GFM). The south firing chamber was equipped similarly. The usine was equipped with two Baudouin motors, of 36 horsepower (27 kW) each.

=== Casemates and shelters ===
The Blockhaus de Sentzich is immediately to the south of the main ouvrage on the other side of the Sentzich village. The blockhouse was armed with a JM/AC47 embrasure.

== Manning ==
The ouvrage (Note: English-language sources use the French term ouvrage as the preferred term for the Maginot positions, in preference to "fort", a term usually reserved for older fortifications with passive defensives in the form of walls and ditches. The literal translation of ouvrage in the sense of a fortification in English is "work." A gros ouvrage is a large fortification with a significant artillery component, while a petit ouvrage is smaller, with lighter arms.) was manned by 66 men of the 168th Fortress Infantry Regiment, under the command of Lieutenant Legrand. The Casernement de Cattenom provided peacetime above-ground barracks and support services to Sentzich and other ouvrages in the area.

== History ==
See Fortified Sector of Thionville for a broader discussion of the events of 1940 in the Thionville sector of the Maginot Line.

Sentzich, closely associated with Galgenberg, did not see significant action in the Battle of France in 1940, nor in the Lorraine Campaign of 1944. The Germans largely bypassed the area, advancing along the valley of the Meuse and Saar rivers, threatening the rear of the Thionville sector. An order to fortress troops by sector commander Colonel Jean-Patrice O'Sullivan to prepare for withdrawal on 17 June was reversed by O'Sullivan. The garrison therefore remained in place. Following negotiations, the positions on the left bank of the Moselle finally surrendered to the Germans on 30 June 1940. While a number of the larger ouvrages in the Thionville sector were renovated immediately after World War II for duty in the Cold War, Sentzich was not rearmed. It remained secured, owing to its position next to Galgenberg, which was used as a communications facility.

== Current condition ==
The ouvrage is owned and maintained by the commune of Cattenom. It is not presently accessible to the public.

== See also ==
- List of all works on Maginot Line
- Siegfried Line
- Atlantic Wall
- Czechoslovak border fortifications

== Bibliography ==
- Allcorn, William. The Maginot Line 1928-45. Oxford: Osprey Publishing, 2003. ISBN 1-84176-646-1
- Kaufmann, J.E. and Kaufmann, H.W. Fortress France: The Maginot Line and French Defenses in World War II, Stackpole Books, 2006. ISBN 0-275-98345-5
- Kaufmann, J.E., Kaufmann, H.W., Jancovič-Potočnik, A. and Lang, P. The Maginot Line: History and Guide, Pen and Sword, 2011. ISBN 978-1-84884-068-3
- Mary, Jean-Yves; Hohnadel, Alain; Sicard, Jacques. Hommes et Ouvrages de la Ligne Maginot, Tome 1. Paris, Histoire & Collections, 2001. ISBN 2-908182-88-2 (in French)
- Mary, Jean-Yves; Hohnadel, Alain; Sicard, Jacques. Hommes et Ouvrages de la Ligne Maginot, Tome 2. Paris, Histoire & Collections, 2003. ISBN 2-908182-97-1 (in French)
- Mary, Jean-Yves; Hohnadel, Alain; Sicard, Jacques. Hommes et Ouvrages de la Ligne Maginot, Tome 3. Paris, Histoire & Collections, 2003. ISBN 2-913903-88-6 (in French)
- Mary, Jean-Yves; Hohnadel, Alain; Sicard, Jacques. Hommes et Ouvrages de la Ligne Maginot, Tome 5. Paris, Histoire & Collections, 2009. ISBN 978-2-35250-127-5 (in French)
