= Ouvrage Oberheid =

- Part of Maginot Line
- Northeast France
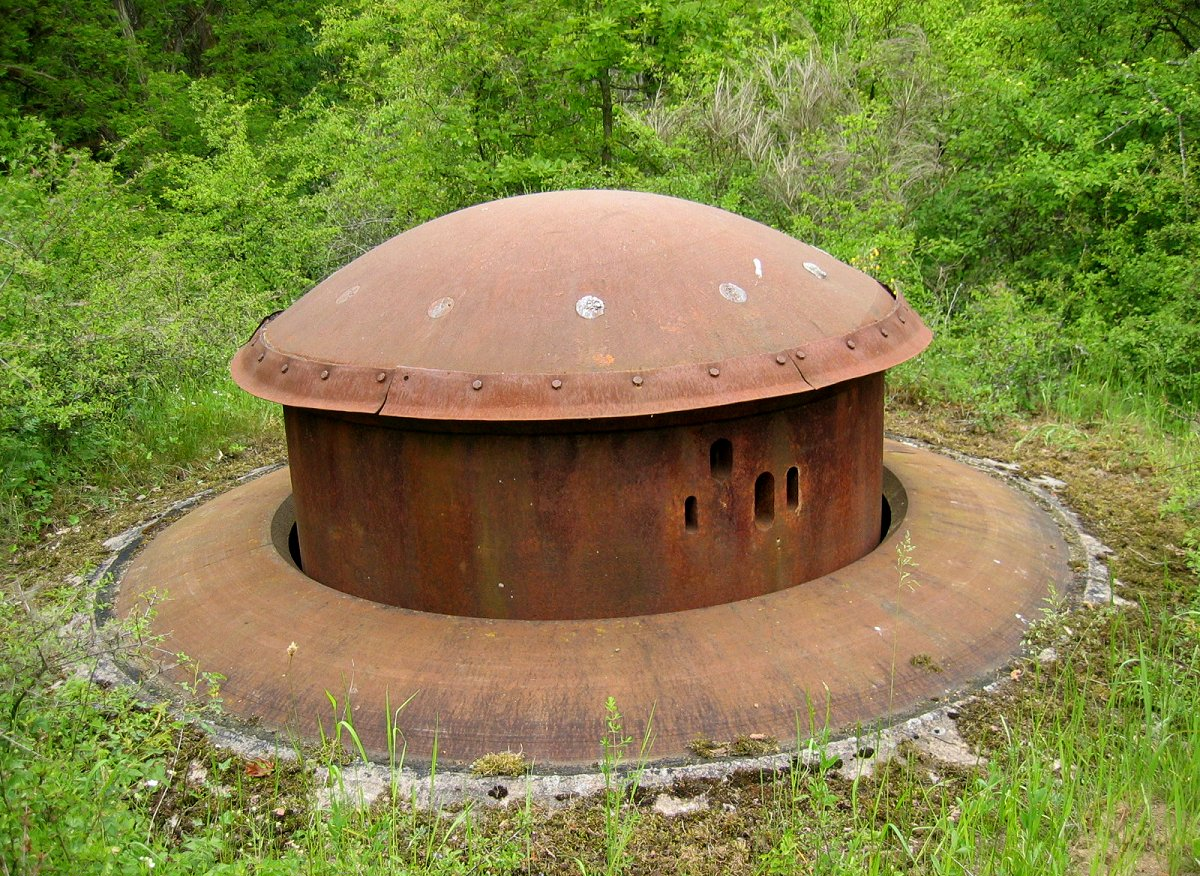
- Machine gun turret, ouvrage Oberheid

Site information
- Controlled by: France
- Open to the public: No
- Condition: Abandoned

Location
- Coordinates: 49.43436°N 6.25261°E

Site history
- Built by: CORF
- Materials: Concrete, steel, deep excavation
- Battles/wars: Battle of France, Lorraine Campaign

Ouvrage Oberheid, also called Ouvrage Oberheide, forms a portion of the Fortified Sector of Thionville of the Maginot Line in northeast France. The petit ouvrage d'infanterie is located on a salient point of the Cattenom Forest between the gros ouvrages Kobenbusch (to the north) and Galgenberg (to the south), which provided covering fire during June 1940, when Oberheid faced daily bombardments and infiltrations. Oberheid has been abandoned and after extensive vandalism has been sealed.

== Design and construction ==
Oberheid was surveyed by CORF (Commission d'Organisation des Régions Fortifiées), the Maginot Line's design and construction agency, in 1930. and the position became operational in 1935, at a cost of 8 million francs. It was built by the contractor Verdun-Fortifications.

== Description ==
The single combat block has two firing chambers and a central barracks surmounted by a machine gun turret. Each firing chamber has a mixed armament of a machine gun and a 37mm anti-tank gun at one embrasure and a machine gun at the other. The ouvrage (Note: English-language sources use the French term ouvrage as the preferred term for the Maginot positions, in preference to "fort", a term usually reserved for older fortifications with passive defensives in the form of walls and ditches. The literal translation of ouvrage in the sense of a fortification in English is "work." A gros ouvrage is a large fortification with a significant artillery component, while a petit ouvrage is smaller, with lighter arms.) is surmounted by a machine gun turret and four automatic rifle cloches (GFMs), which provided artillery spotting for the ouvrage Métrich. The small usine is equipped with two 36 horsepower (27 kW) Baudouin engines.

== Manning ==
The ouvrage possessed a garrison of 78 men of the 168th Fortress Infantry Regiment, under the orders of Lieutenant Pobeau and his assistant, Lieutenant Sépulchre.

== History ==
See Fortified Sector of Thionville for a broader discussion of the events of 1940 in the Thionville sector of the Maginot Line.

Oberheid did not see significant action in the Battle of France in 1940, nor in the Lorraine Campaign of 1944. In 1940 German infiltrators occupied the surface of Oberheid, requiring suppressing fire to be directed from neighboring Kobenbusch. The Germans largely bypassed the area, advancing along the valley of the Meuse and Saar rivers, threatening the rear of the Thionville sector. The garrison therefore remained in place. Following negotiations, the positions on the left bank of the Moselle finally surrendered to the Germans on 30 June 1940.

== Current condition ==
The French Army continues to control Oberheid. After extensive vandalism, the entrances have been buried to prevent access.

== See also ==
- List of all works on Maginot Line
- Siegfried Line
- Atlantic Wall
- Czechoslovak border fortifications

== Bibliography ==
- Allcorn, William. The Maginot Line 1928-45. Oxford: Osprey Publishing, 2003. ISBN 1-84176-646-1
- Kaufmann, J.E. and Kaufmann, H.W. Fortress France: The Maginot Line and French Defenses in World War II, Stackpole Books, 2006. ISBN 0-275-98345-5
- Kaufmann, J.E., Kaufmann, H.W., Jancovič-Potočnik, A. and Lang, P. The Maginot Line: History and Guide, Pen and Sword, 2011. ISBN 978-1-84884-068-3
- Mary, Jean-Yves; Hohnadel, Alain; Sicard, Jacques. Hommes et Ouvrages de la Ligne Maginot, Tome 1. Paris, Histoire & Collections, 2001. ISBN 2-908182-88-2 (in French)
- Mary, Jean-Yves; Hohnadel, Alain; Sicard, Jacques. Hommes et Ouvrages de la Ligne Maginot, Tome 2. Paris, Histoire & Collections, 2003. ISBN 2-908182-97-1 (in French)
- Mary, Jean-Yves; Hohnadel, Alain; Sicard, Jacques. Hommes et Ouvrages de la Ligne Maginot, Tome 3. Paris, Histoire & Collections, 2003. ISBN 2-913903-88-6 (in French)
- Mary, Jean-Yves; Hohnadel, Alain; Sicard, Jacques. Hommes et Ouvrages de la Ligne Maginot, Tome 5. Paris, Histoire & Collections, 2009. ISBN 978-2-35250-127-5 (in French)
