= Fortified Sector of Thionville =

Fortified sector of the Maginot Line

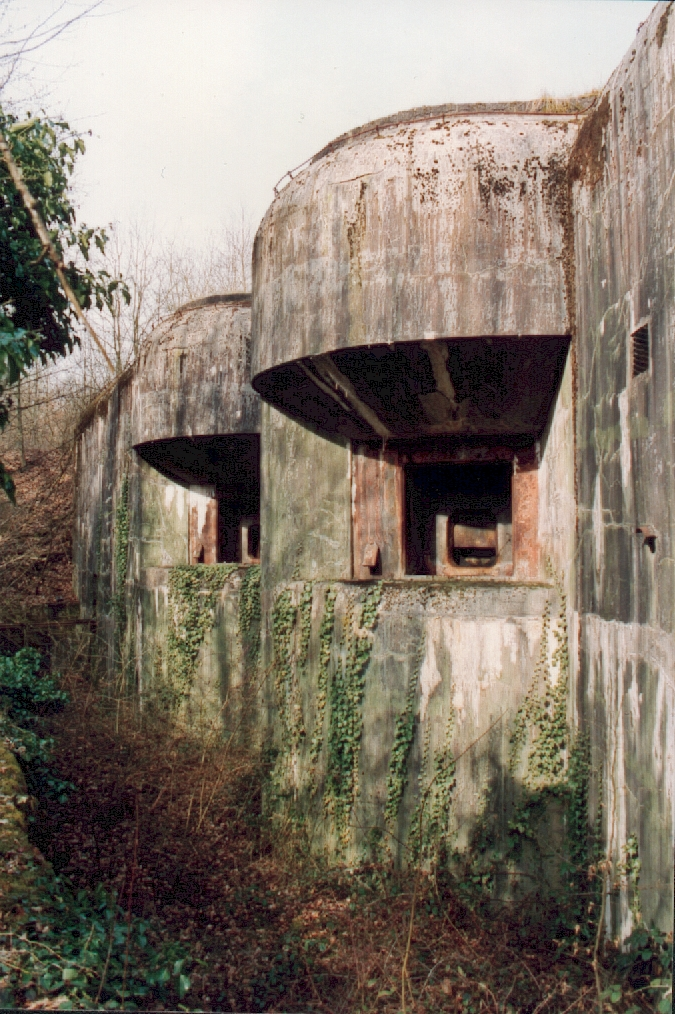
Ouvrage Billig, Block 5 casemates

The Fortified Sector of Thionville (Secteur fortifié de Thionville) was the French military organisation that in 1940 controlled the section of the Maginot Line immediately to the north of Thionville. The sector describes an arc of about 25 kilometres (16 mi), about halfway between the French border with Luxembourg and Thionville. The Thionville sector was the strongest of the Maginot Line sectors. It was surrounded but not seriously attacked in 1940 by German forces in the Battle of France, whose main objective was the city of Metz. Despite the withdrawal of the mobile forces that supported the fixed fortifications, the sector successfully fended off German assaults before the Second Armistice at Compiègne. The majority of the positions and their garrisons finally surrendered on 27 June 1940, the remainder on 2 July. Following the war, many positions were reactivated for use during the Cold War. Four locations are now preserved and open to the public.

The Thionville sector was part of the larger Fortified Region of Metz, a strongly defended area between the Ardennes to the west and the Sarre Valley to the east. The Metz region was more important during the planning and construction phase of the Maginot Line than it was in the operational phase of the Line, when the sectors assumed prominence. The Fortified Region of Metz was dissolved as a military organisation on 18 March 1940.

== Concept and Organisation ==
The sector was planned to protect Thionville, an important industrial city, and by extension, Metz, just to the south. Construction began in most places in 1930, and was largely complete by 1935. A reinforcing line was planned to back up the Cattenom salient, which protruded to the north between Bois-Karre and Galgenberg, with Kobenbusch forming the point of the northward projection. Two casemate groups and the petit ouvrage du Beysel were proposed but were never built. The reinforcing role was partially assumed by three ex-German fortifications, the Forts de Guentrange, Illange and Koenigsmacker, which encircled Thionville and possessed long-range artillery.

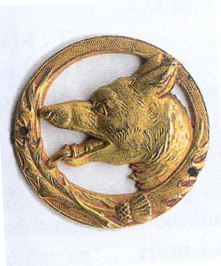
Insignia of the 167th RIF.

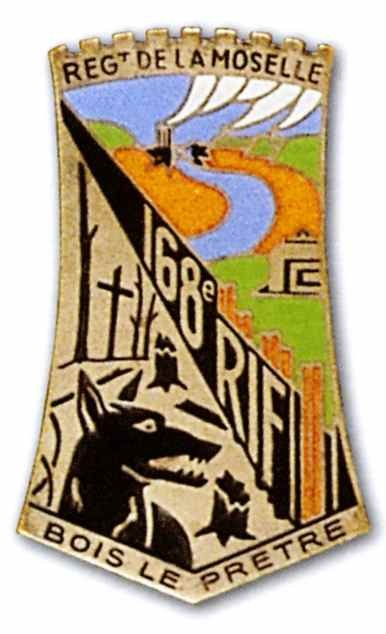
Insignia of the 168th RIF.

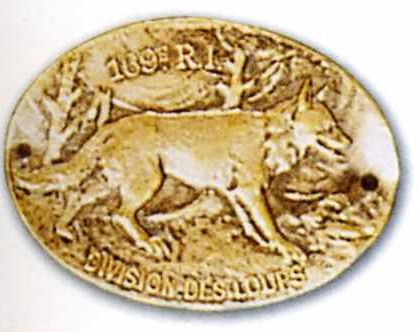
Insignia of the 69th RIF.

== Command ==
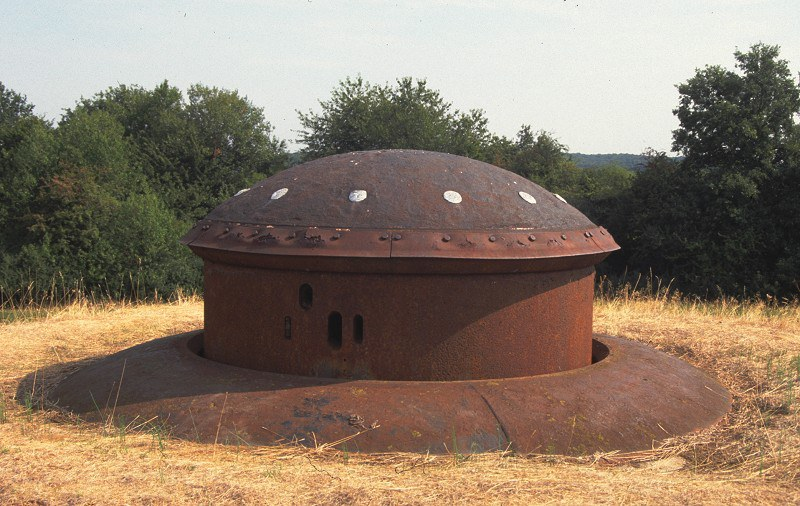
Machine gun turret, Immerhof

The Thionville sector was under the overall command of the French 3rd Army, headquartered at Fort Jeanne d'Arc at Metz, under the command of General Charles Condé, which was in turn part of Army Group 2 under General André-Gaston Prételat. The SF (secteur fortifiée) Thionville was commanded by General Cousse, then General Poisot from 1 January 1940. The command post was in the Fort d'Illange, south of Thionville. The interval troops, the army formations that were to provide the mobile defence for the sector, to support and be supported by the fixed defences, were under the command of the Colonial Corps (Corps d'Armee Colonial (CAC)), General Fredenberg, commanding from the Château de Bétange. The Colonial Corps was in turn made up of the 2nd and 56th Infantry Divisions. Artillery support for the sector was provided by the 151st Position Artillery Regiment (Régiment d'Artillerie de Position (RAP)), which controlled both fixed and mobile artillery, commanded by Lt Colonel Martin. The 2nd ID was made up of Class A reservists, while the 56th ID was a Class B reserve formation, not considered suitable for significant combat.

== Description ==
The sector includes, in order from west to east, the following major fortified positions, together with the most significant casemates and infantry shelters (abris) in each sub-sector: (Note: English-language sources use the French term ouvrage as the preferred term for the Maginot positions, in preference to "fort", a term usually reserved for older fortifications with passive defenses in the form of walls and ditches. The literal translation of ouvrage in the sense of a fortification in English is "work." A gros ouvrage is a large fortification with a significant artillery component, while a petit ouvrage is smaller, with lighter arms.)

=== Subsector of Angevillers/Ouentrange ===
169th Fortress Infantry Regiment (169e Régiment d'Infanterie de Forteresse (RIF)), Chef de Bataillon Toussaint, command post at Bois de la Côte

- Ouvrage Rochonvillers, gros ouvrage A8 of nine combat blocks and two entry blocks
- Ouvrage Molvange, gros ouvrage A9 of ten combat blocks and two entry blocks
- Casemate d'Entrange, C41
- Abri du Bois-de-Kanfen, X5 (Note: An abri is an infantry shelter, sometimes underground or under earth cover. An abri in the main Maginot Line often closely resembles a casemate, but is more lightly armed and can hold more occupants.)
- Casemate du Bois-de-Kanfen Ouest, C42
- Casemate du Bois-de-Kanfen Est, C43
- Abri du Zeiterholz, X6

Peacetime barracks and support:

- Casernement d'Angevillers

=== Subsector of Hettange-Grande ===
168th Fortress Infantry Regiment (168e Régiment d'Infanterie de Forteresse (RIF)), Lt-Colonel Ferroni, command post at Sainte-Marie

- Ouvrage Immerhof, petit ouvrage A10 of three combat blocks and one entry block
- Ouvrage Soetrich, gros ouvrage A11 of six combat blocks and two entry blocks
- Ouvrage Bois-Karre, petit ouvrage A12, single block with no underground facilities
- Ouvrage Kobenbusch, gros ouvrage A13 of seven combat blocks and two entry blocks
- Ouvrage Oberheid, petit ouvrage A14, single block with no underground facilities
- Abri de Stressling, X7
- Abri d'Hettange, X8
- Observatoire d'Hettange, O9
- Abri du Route-du-Luxembourg, X9
- Observatoire du Route-du-Luxembourg, O10
- Abri de Helmreich, X10
- Observatoire de Boust, O13
- Casemate de Boust, C44
- Abri de Barrungshof, X11
- Abri du Bois-Karre, X12
- Casemate de Bass-Parthe Ouest, C45
- Casemate de Bass-Parthe Est, C46
- Abri de Rippert, X13
- Abri du Bois-de-Cattenom, X14

Pre-Maginot supporting fortification:

- Fort de Guentrange (Groupe Fortifiée de Guentrange)
- Fort de Koenigsmacker (Groupe Fortifiée de Koenigsmacker)
- Fort d'Illange (Groupe Fortifiée d'Illange)

Peacetime barracks and support:

- Casernement de Hettange-Grande
- Casernement de Cattenom

=== Subsector of Elzange ===
167th Fortress Infantry Regiment (167e Régiment d'Infanterie de Forteresse (RIF)), Lt. Colonel Planet, command post at the Fort de Koenigsmacker

- Ouvrage Galgenberg, gros ouvrage A15 of six combat blocks and two entry blocks
- Ouvrage Sentzich, petit ouvrage A16 with a single combat block and no underground passages
- Ouvrage Métrich, gros ouvrage A17 of ten combat blocks and two entries
- Ouvrage Billig, gros ouvrage A18 of seven combat blocks and one entry
- Observatoire de Cattenom, O20
- Casemate du Sonnenberg, C47
- Blockhaus de Sentzich, Cb8
- Casemate de Koenigsmacker Nord, C48
- Casemate de Koenigsmacker Sud, C49
- Casemate de Métrich Nord, C50
- Casemate de Métrich Sud, C51
- Abri de Krekelbusch, X15
- Abri du Sud de Métrich, X16
- Abri du Nonnenberg, X17
- Abri du Nord de Bichel, X18
- Casemate du Bois-de-Koenigsmacker, C52
- Abri du Sud-de-Bichel, X19

Peacetime barracks and support:

- Casernement de Cattenom
- Casernement d'Elzange

== History ==
=== Battle of France ===
During the early part of the Battle of France, the SF Thionville was relatively quiet. Both sides kept up shelling and harassing attacks, but there were no major engagements in the sector in May and early June 1940. Elsewhere, the situation was deteriorating fast. To the west, the German 16th Army was advancing up the valley of the Meuse to Verdun, aiming for Metz and Nancy. In the centre, the German 1st Army had broken through at the Sarre on 15 June. To the east, the Rhine was crossed on the same day. German armies were moving freely behind French lines with the goal of encircling France's field armies, capturing the cities of Alsace and Lorraine, and cutting off the fixed fortifications.

By mid-June, faced with the progressive collapse of the French First Army to the west, the interval troops began to pull back to avoid being encircled behind the Maginot Line. Measure A, issued by 3rd Army headquarters, called for the withdrawal of the interval troops on 15 June, protected by the casemates and ouvrages. Measure B was the withdrawal of artillery forces from the intervals late that day and into the 16th, protected by the ouvrages. Measure C was the withdrawal of all but skeleton forces from the fortifications. The forces left behind were to withdraw themselves by the 18th after sabotaging all equipment and weapons. Although the interval troops were able to temporarily escape, by the 17th the Thionville sector had been enveloped by the Germans from the east and west. Retreat was impossible for the fortress troops.

On 21 June General Wilhelm Ritter von Leeb ordered all attacks against Maginot fortifications to stop, as a waste of resources. Action between the 21st and the date of the June 25 armistice was limited to sporadic shelling and, on the French side, to firing off ammunition at the Germans before it could be captured. Apart from determined German shelling of Block 5 at Rochonvillers, there were no significant attacks on Thionville sector ouvrages.

Following the armistice, brief negotiations undertaken by the commandant of Kobenbusch settled on a formal surrender for the garrisons west of the Moselle on 30 June. No such negotiations took place to the east until French officers received confirmation directly from General Huntziger that they were to surrender their fortifications. The eastern positions of the SF Thionville were surrendered on 2 July 1940

=== Lorraine Campaign ===
While the main Maginot fortifications played no significant role in the Lorraine Campaign of 1944, the pre-Maginot fortifications of Thionville posed a significant obstacle to the advance of American forces, most notably the Fort de Koenigsmacker. The U.S. 90th Infantry Division captured Koenigsmacker after three days of hard fighting on 12 November 1944.

=== Môle de Rochonvillers ===
Following World War II, the French military reclaimed the Maginot Line with the aim of renovating and improving it against a possible attack by Warsaw Pact forces. The strongest positions, Rochonvillers, Molvange and Bréhain of the neighbouring former SF Crusnes were designated the môle de Rochonvillers ("breakwater") in 1951 and were placed back into service after a period of rehabilitation. Petit ouvrage Immerhof was included in this assemblage Lesser positions, such as Soetrich, Bois-Karre and Sentzich, were repaired and kept as government property, as were the remaining gros ouvrages in the sector, but were not formally designated as places of defence. After the establishment of the French nuclear strike force, the importance of the Line declined, and maintenance ceased in the 1970s, with most of the casemates and petit ouvrages sold to the public.

=== Command centres ===
In the early 1960s, three ouvrages were renovated as military command centres. Rochonvillers was converted for use as a wartime command centre for the Central Army Group (CENTAG) of NATO and was used for this purpose from 1961 to 1967, when France withdrew from the NATO integrated command structure. In a similar manner, Molvange became the wartime command centre for the 4th Allied Tactical Air Forces, again from 1961 to 1967. The French military continued to make use of Molvange until 1999. Soetrich saw a similar role in the 1960s. Rochonvillers was reactivated in 1980 as the wartime command centre for the French First Army, operating in that role until 1998. In each of the comparatively spacious underground barracks, magazine space and utility areas were used and expanded. The combat blocks were not used and were sealed from the occupied areas.

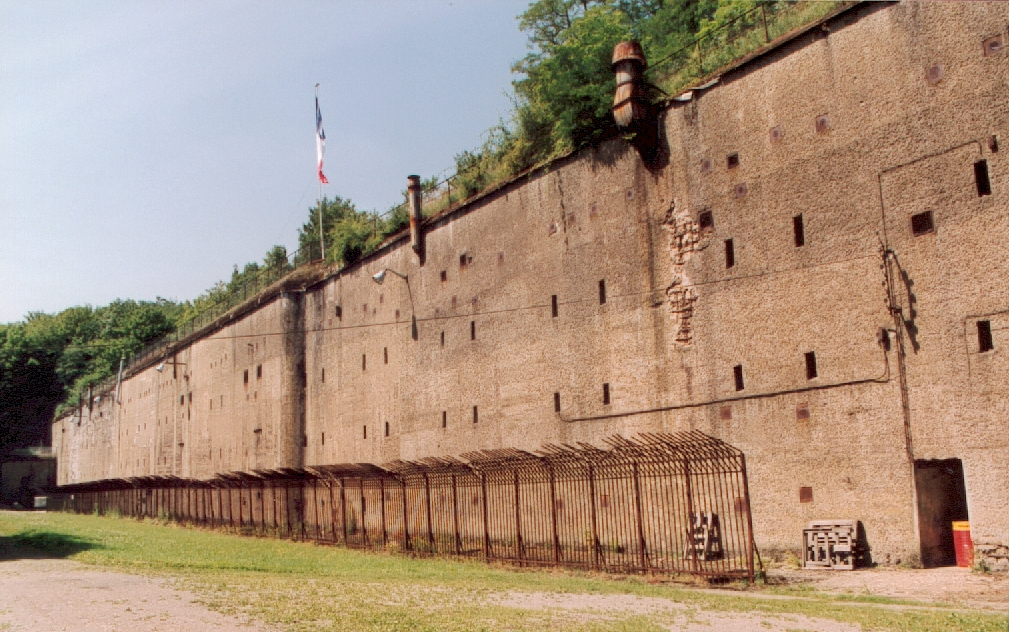
Fort de Guentrange, main caserne

== Present status ==
Immerhof, Bois-Karre and Galgenberg are operated as museums and are open to the public. The surface of Kobenbusch is a nature preserve with trails and interpretive signs. The lower levels of Kobenbusch have been flooded by the cooling water lake of the Cattenom Nuclear Power Plant, which was built on the site of the Camp de Cattenom. The Casemate du Grand Lot near Rochonvillers is occasionally open for tours. The Abri du Zeiterholz has been restored and is open for tours in the summer months. The Abri du Bois de Cattenom is occasionally open to visits. The remainder are either privately owned or are military property, abandoned and sealed.

The pre-Maginot Fort de Guentrange is operated as a museum. The surface installations of the Fort d'Illange are accessible to the public, and a similar public use is proposed for the Fort de Koenigsmacker.

== Bibliography ==
- Allcorn, William. The Maginot Line 1928-45. Oxford: Osprey Publishing, 2003. ISBN 1-84176-646-1
- Degon, André; Zylberyng, Didier, La Ligne Maginot: Guide des Forts à Visiter, Editions Ouest-France, 2014. ISBN 978-2-7373-6080-0 (in French)
- Kaufmann, J.E. and Kaufmann, H.W. Fortress France: The Maginot Line and French Defenses in World War II, Stackpole Books, 2006. ISBN 0-275-98345-5
- Kaufmann, J.E., Kaufmann, H.W., Jancovič-Potočnik, A. and Lang, P. The Maginot Line: History and Guide, Pen and Sword, 2011. ISBN 978-1-84884-068-3
- Mary, Jean-Yves; Hohnadel, Alain; Sicard, Jacques. Hommes et Ouvrages de la Ligne Maginot, Tome 1. Paris, Histoire & Collections, 2001. ISBN 2-908182-88-2 (in French)
- Mary, Jean-Yves; Hohnadel, Alain; Sicard, Jacques. Hommes et Ouvrages de la Ligne Maginot, Tome 3. Paris, Histoire & Collections, 2003. ISBN 2-913903-88-6 (in French)
- Mary, Jean-Yves; Hohnadel, Alain; Sicard, Jacques. Hommes et Ouvrages de la Ligne Maginot, Tome 5. Paris, Histoire & Collections, 2009. ISBN 978-2-35250-127-5 (in French)
- Romanych, Marc; Rupp, Martin. Maginot Line 1940: Battles on the French Frontier. Oxford: Osprey Publishing, 2010. ISBN 1-84176-646-1
