= Ouvrage Kobenbusch =

Ouvrage of the Maginot Line

- Part of Maginot Line
- Northeast France
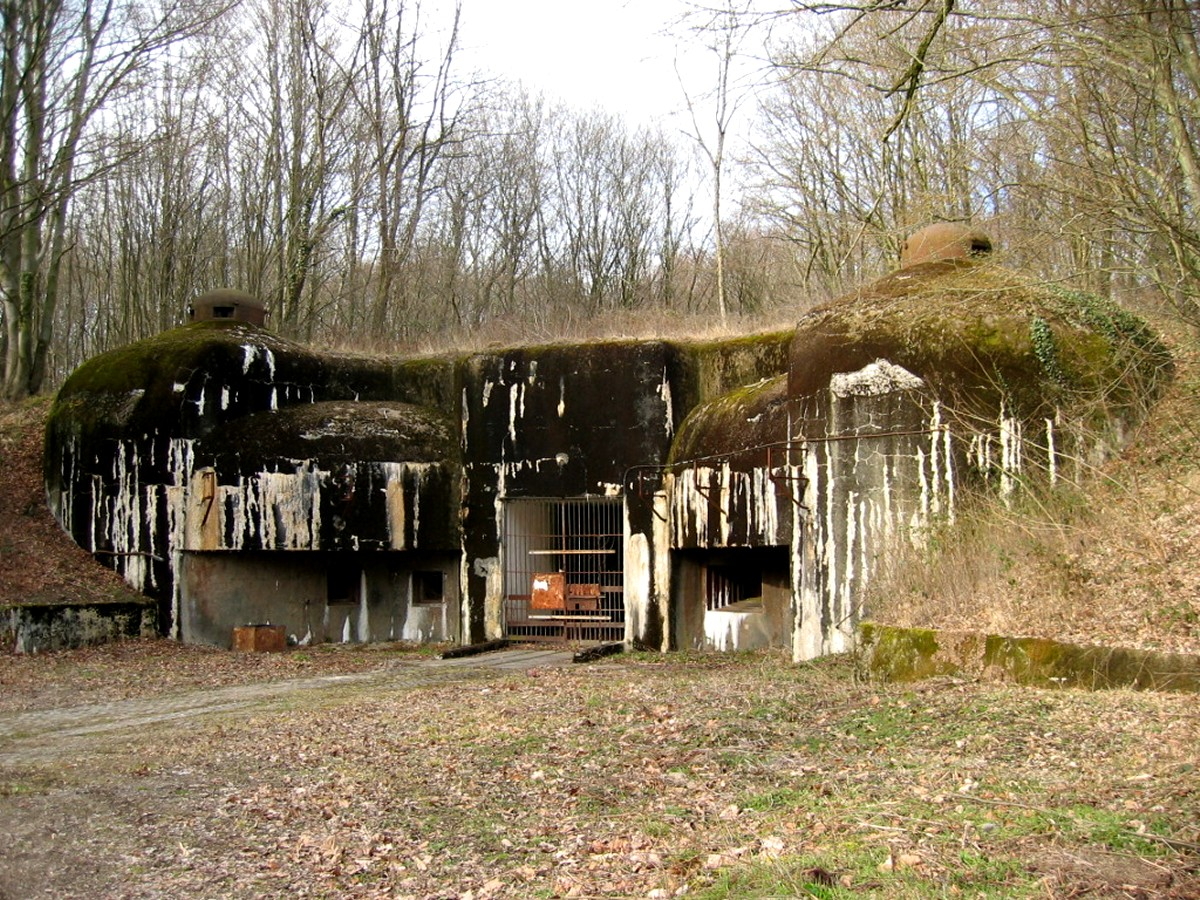
- Ammunition entrance

Site information
- Controlled by: France
- Open to the public: Surface only
- Condition: Flooded

Location
- Coordinates: 49.43382°N 6.23796°E

Site history
- Built by: CORF
- Materials: Concrete, steel, deep excavation
- Battles/wars: Battle of France, Lorraine Campaign

Ouvrage du Kobenbusch is a gros ouvrage of the Maginot Line, located in the Fortified Sector of Thionville in the Cattenom Forest. It possesses seven combat blocks and two entrance blocks, one for ammunition and the other for men. It is located between petit ouvrage Bois-Karre and petit ouvrage Oberheid, and was named for the surrounding Kobenbusch Forest.

The position saw little action during World War II. Its deep passages have been flooded by the construction of a cooling water lake for a nearby nuclear power plant, but its surface features are being developed with an interpretive path through the surrounding forest.

== Design and construction ==
The Kobenbusch position forms the point of the Cattenom salient, where the east-west defensive line turns to the south. The site was surveyed by CORF (Commission d'Organisation des Régions Fortifiées), the Maginot Line's design and construction agency, in 1930. Work by the contractor Verdun-Fortifications began in 1931, and the position became operational in 1935, at a cost of 65 million francs.

Kobenbusch was served by a 60 cm-gauge narrow-gauge railway, which enters at the munitions entrance and runs all the way out through the galleries to the combat blocks. On the surface, the railway connects to supply points to the rear and to other ouvrages. (Note: English-language sources use the French term ouvrage as the preferred term for the Maginot positions, in preference to "fort", a term usually reserved for older fortifications with passive defensives in the form of walls and ditches. The literal translation of ouvrage in the sense of a fortification in English is "work." A gros ouvrage is a large fortification with a significant artillery component, while a petit ouvrage is smaller, with lighter arms.)

== Description ==
Kobenbusch is a relatively compact gros ouvrage, with a short main gallery leading from the munitions and personnel entrances past to underground barracks to the combat blocks. Unusually for a gros ouvrage, it possesses no "M1" main ammunition magazine.

- Ammunition entrance: Shaft entry, two automatic rifle cloches (GFM), 3 FM embrasures and a machine gun/47 mm anti-tank gun (JM/AC47) embrasure.
- Personnel entrance: Shaft entry, one GFM cloche and one JM/AC47 embrasure.
- Block 1: one machine gun turret and GFM cloche.
- Block 2: one machine gun embrasure (JM), a JM/AC47 embrasure and two GFM cloches.
- Block 3: one observation cloche (VDP) and a GFM cloche.
- Block 4: one machine-gun turret, a machine gun cloche (JM) and a GM cloche.
- Block 5: one 75 mm turret and a GFm cloche.
- Block 6: one 50 mm mortar turret and a GFM cloche.
- Block 7: three 75 mm gun embrasures, two GFM cloches and a grenade launcher cloche (LG).

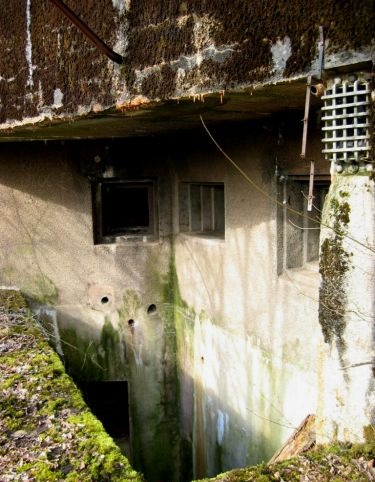
Block 2, embrasures and the diamant ditch

.

=== Casemates and shelters ===
The Abri du Bois-de-Cattenom (Note: An abri is an infantry shelter, sometimes underground or under earth cover. An abri in the main Maginot Line often closely resembles a casemate, but is more lightly armed and can hold more occupants.) is nearby to the west, and may be visited. There are no other casemates, observation points or shelters associated with Kobenbusch, although the petit ouvrage Oberheid is close at hand on the east.

== Manning ==
The manning of the ouvrage in 1940 comprised 513 men and 14 officers of the 169th Fortress Infantry Regiment and the 151st Position Artillery Regiment. The units were under the umbrella of the 42nd Fortress Corps of the 3rd Army, Army Group 2. The commandant de l'ouvrage in 1940 was Commandant Charnal. The Casernement de Cattenom provided peacetime above-ground barracks and support services to Kobenbusch and other ouvrages in the area.

== History ==
See Fortified Sector of Thionville for a broader discussion of the events of 1940 in the Thionville sector of the Maginot Line.

Kobenbusch did not see significant action in the Battle of France in 1940, nor in the Lorraine Campaign of 1944. Kobenbusch provided suppressing fire against German infiltrators on the surface of Oberheid. About the same time, a party of Germans infiltrated the area of Kobenbusch Block 5. The Germans largely bypassed the area, advancing along the valley of the Meuse and Saar rivers, threatening the rear of the Thionville sector. An order to fortress troops by sector commander Colonel Jean-Patrice O'Sullivan to prepare for withdrawal on 17 June was reversed by O'Sullivan. The garrison therefore remained in place. Following negotiations, the positions on the left bank of the Moselle finally surrendered to the Germans on 30 June 1940.

== Present status ==
While the entry and combat blocks remain visible, the underground galleries, barracks, ammunition magazine and utility areas, which lie at an average depth of 30 meters (98 ft) below the surface, have been flooded by the cooling water lake of the nearby Cattenom Nuclear Power Plant. The site has been owned by EDF since the construction of the power plant in 1981. It is maintained by the Association Ligne Maginot du Secteur Fortifié du Bois de Cattenom, which manages Bois Karre, the Abri du Bois de Cattenom, Ouvrage Sentzich and Ouvrage Galgenberg. A pedestrian path through the surface installation is under development, and the Abri du Bois de Cattenom may be visited at times.

== See also ==
- List of all works on Maginot Line
- Siegfried Line
- Atlantic Wall
- Czechoslovak border fortifications

== Bibliography ==
- Allcorn, William. The Maginot Line 1928-45. Oxford: Osprey Publishing, 2003. ISBN 1-84176-646-1
- Kaufmann, J.E. and Kaufmann, H.W. Fortress France: The Maginot Line and French Defenses in World War II, Stackpole Books, 2006. ISBN 0-275-98345-5
- Kaufmann, J.E., Kaufmann, H.W., Jancovič-Potočnik, A. and Lang, P. The Maginot Line: History and Guide, Pen and Sword, 2011. ISBN 978-1-84884-068-3
- Mary, Jean-Yves; Hohnadel, Alain; Sicard, Jacques. Hommes et Ouvrages de la Ligne Maginot, Tome 1. Paris, Histoire & Collections, 2001. ISBN 2-908182-88-2 (in French)
- Mary, Jean-Yves; Hohnadel, Alain; Sicard, Jacques. Hommes et Ouvrages de la Ligne Maginot, Tome 2. Paris, Histoire & Collections, 2003. ISBN 2-908182-97-1 (in French)
- Mary, Jean-Yves; Hohnadel, Alain; Sicard, Jacques. Hommes et Ouvrages de la Ligne Maginot, Tome 3. Paris, Histoire & Collections, 2003. ISBN 2-913903-88-6 (in French)
- Mary, Jean-Yves; Hohnadel, Alain; Sicard, Jacques. Hommes et Ouvrages de la Ligne Maginot, Tome 5. Paris, Histoire & Collections, 2009. ISBN 978-2-35250-127-5 (in French)
