= Fort de Koenigsmacker =

Fortification in Moselle, France

- Part of Thionville festen/Fortified group of Thionville
- Thionville, France

Site information
- Type: Fort, Moselstellung
- Owner: French Army
- Controlled by: France
- Open to the public: No
- Condition: Abandoned

Location
- Coordinates: 49.37982°N 6.25778°E

Site history
- Built: 1908
- Battles/wars: Lorraine Campaign

The Fort de Koenigsmacker (Koenigsmaker, Königsmachern or Kœnigsmacker) is a fortification located to the northeast of Thionville in the Moselle department of France. It was built by Germany next to the town of the same name in the early 20th century after the annexation of the Moselle following the Franco-Prussian War. The Fort de Koenigsmacker was part of the Moselstellung, a group of eleven fortresses surrounding Thionville and Metz to guard against the possibility of a French attack aimed at regaining Alsace and Lorraine, with construction taking place between 1908 and 1914. The fortification system incorporated new principles of defensive construction to deal with advances in artillery. Later forts, such as Koenigsmacker, embodied innovative design concepts such as dispersal and concealment. These later forts were designed to support offensive operations, as an anchor for a pivoting move by German forces into France.

The Feste Koenigsmacker, as Fort de Koenigsmacker was called by the Germans, with Fort de Guentrange and Fort d'Illange, assured the protection of Thionville against French attack. Positioned to the rear of the principal lines of combat in the First World War, the fort never saw combat in that war, but posed a significant obstacle to advancing American forces in World War II.

== Description ==
The Fort de Koenigsmacker is located about 4 kilometers (2.5 mi) to the northeast of Thionville on a hilltop overlooking the salient formed by the Cattenom forest and the northern crossings of the Moselle. It was defended by a garrison of 1180 men. Like the Fort d'Illange, Koenigsmacker features an armored battery, originally armed with four short 100 mm guns in single turrets. Four separate fortified barracks housed troops, with underground galleries connected the battery, barracks, and infantry positions. A ditch, defended by a counterscarp and three caponiers, is located on the south and east sides.

The dispersed, un-walled nature of the later Moselstellung was a significant innovation. Compared to the French Séré de Rivières system forts of the same era, later German fortifications such as Koenigsmacker were scattered over a large area and enclosed chiefly by barbed wire. While certain individual elements presented imposing walls to an attacker, these walls were not continuous. The dispersed nature is evidenced by the official French name: the Groupe Fortifié de Koenigsmacker (Fortified Group of Koenigsmacker). These arrangements were studied and improved upon by the French in the construction of the Maginot Line.

Koenigsmacker's fairly compact arrangement includes four dispersed fortified barracks built into a hillside so that their rears are shielded by earth, while the tops and fronts are protected by three or four meters of concrete, and are surmounted by parapets. The south barracks was constructed as an infantry shelter, or abri, with no living accommodations. The single battery is similarly constructed and linked to the barracks by tunnels. The four 100 mm guns in the battery were protected by Schumann turrets and controlled by an armored observation cupola on top of the western barracks. The whole was surrounded by deep networks of barbed wire, which were swept by fire from small perimeter blockhouses, also linked via the tunnel system. The interior of the position was equipped with trenches for infantry. The barracks and batteries were further armored with reinforced concrete and armored windows. A variety of blockhouses and infantry shelters were also built in the intervals between forts. the tunnels total 2,600 meters (8,500 ft) in length.

Two additional armored batteries were planned for the hill to the northeast of the fort, but were never built. The barracks were provided with central heat, while a central utility plant generated electricity using five 40 hp diesel engines.

== Operational concept ==
From 1899, the Germans viewed Metz as a secure position that could provide an anchor for a pivoting movement into France from the Low Countries. This strategy, which would become known as the Schlieffen Plan, required that the Moselstellung deter an advance by French forces into Lorraine while the German forces mobilized.

== History ==
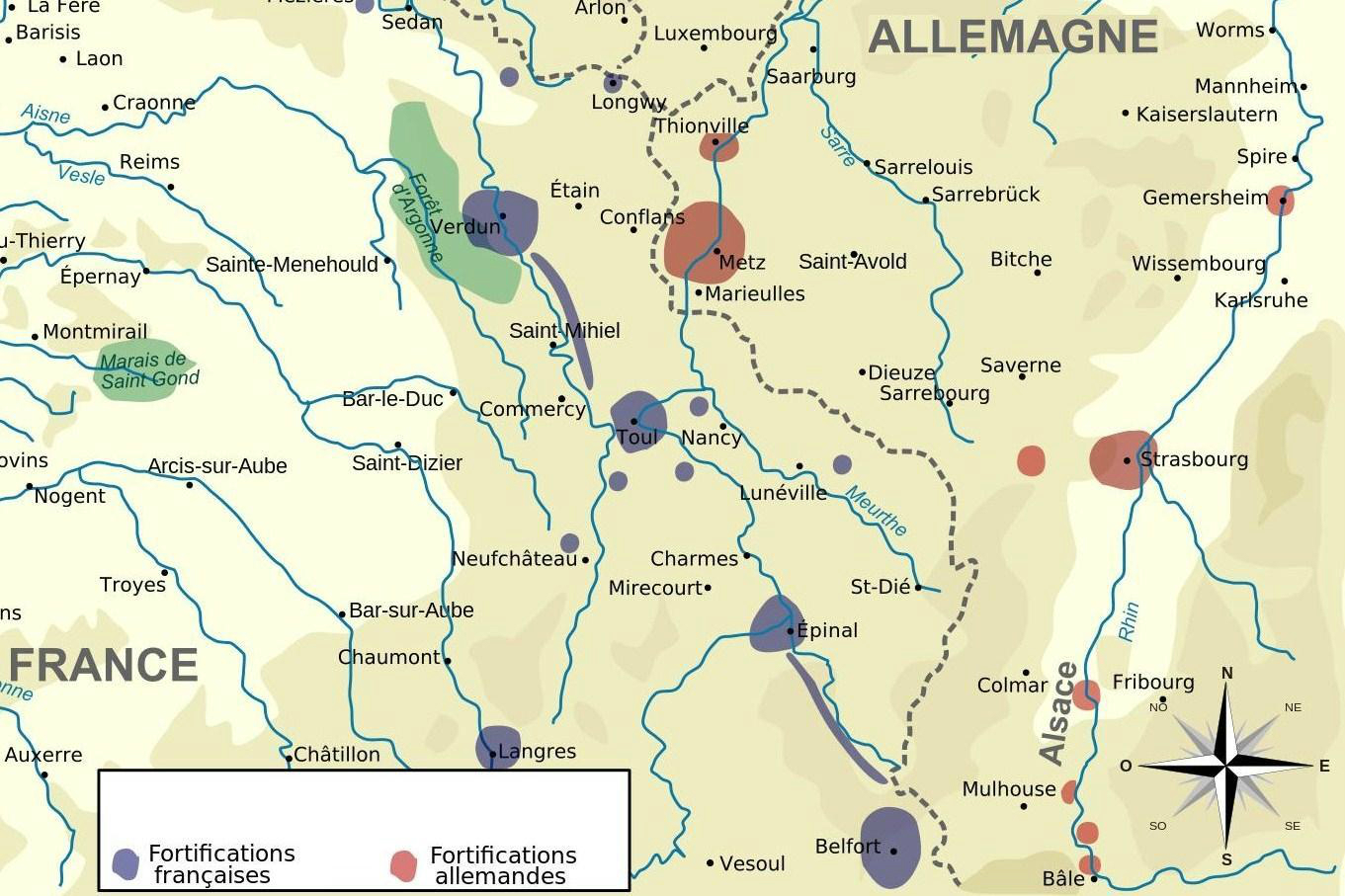
Franco-German border, 1914

Begun in 1908, Koenigsmacker was incomplete at the outbreak of war in 1914. It saw no action during World War I, as Thionville remained well within German lines for the duration of the war. With the Compiègne armistice of 1918, Lorraine was returned to France and the fort became French property. The three Thionville forts became known as the Fortified Group of Thionville.

See Fortified Sector of Thionville for a broader discussion of the Thionville sector of the Maginot Line.

The Fort de Koenigsmacker was integrated into the Fortified Sector of Thionville of the Maginot Line in the 1930s, serving as a sub-sector command post and backing up the newer Maginot ouvrages that were built about halfway between Thionville and the border with Luxembourg. The short 105 mm guns were replaced by 105 mm long guns removed from the German fortifications of Metz. The artillery range was thus increased from 9,700 meters (6.0 mi) to 12,700 meters (7.9 mi). In 1940 Koenigsmacker was the command post for the 167th Fortress Infantry Regiment (RIF), which manned the nearby Maginot ouvrages. During the Battle of France the Thionville area was bypassed and encircled by German forces, with the Maginot and earlier fortifications seeing little action.

Koenigsmacker overlooks the crossing of the Moselle at Cattenom. During the Lorraine Campaign of World War II, the U.S. 90th Infantry Division crossed the flooded Moselle early on 9 November 1944. Fire from Koenigsmacker destroyed bridging equipment and harassed boat-borne troops, but elements of the 358th Infantry Regiment established a lodgement on the east bank and infiltrated the area of the fort before daybreak. The initial American assault took the German garrison, manned by the 74th regiment of the 19th Volksgrenadier Division, by surprise, but German resistance quickly became more effective. American combat engineers took over the assault, using explosives to destroy or seal openings and ventilation shafts. The engineers used such a quantity of explosives that they ran out, and had to be replenished by an airdrop. The fort's 100 mm guns could not be depressed to deal with the close-in attackers, but kept up fire on nearby U.S. formations. By nightfall the Americans had occupied a portion of the fort's surface. The next morning, Company C of the 358th attacked from the south, encountering a fortified ditch. Companies A and B meanwhile occupied the fort's surface and continued with attacks using demolition charges, while the fort kept up artillery fire on American units trying to pass by the fort. On the 11th much of the fort had been suppressed, but its guns continued to fire. A relief patrol of 145 Germans attempting to relieve the fort was ambushed and captured. On the 12th an assault by G Company of the 358th coincided with a decision by the German garrison to evacuate. Surrounded, the Germans surrendered. More than 300 Germans were captured or casualties, with 111 American casualties.

After the war the site remained military property, but was not used. The fort is abandoned and partly stripped.

== Manning ==
Under German occupation in 1944, Koenigsmacker was garrisoned by the 74th Volksgrenadier Regiment of the 19th Volksgrenadier Division.

== Present status ==
A proposal has been made to clean up the site and make it accessible with paths and a parking area in the manner of the park at Fort d'Illange. The site remains dangerous and is not open to the public.
