= Luftflotte 2 =

Division of the German Luftwaffe in World War II

- Active: 1 February 1939
- Disbanded: 27 September 1944
- Country: Nazi Germany
- Branch: Luftwaffe
- Type: Command

Luftflotte 2 (Air Fleet 2) was one of the primary divisions of the German Luftwaffe in World War II. It was formed 1 February 1939 in Braunschweig and transferred to Italy on 15 November 1941. The Luftflotte was disbanded on 27 September 1944.

== Commanding officers ==
- General Hellmuth Felmy, 1 February 1939 – 12 January 1940
- Generalfeldmarschall Albert Kesselring, 12 January 1940 – 11 June 1943
- Generalfeldmarschall Wolfram Freiherr von Richthofen, 12 June 1943 – 27 September 1944

Chief of staff

- Oberst Josef Kammhuber, 1 October 1939 – 19 December 1939
- Generalmajor Wilhelm Speidel, 19 December 1939 – 30 January 1940
- Oberst Gerhard Bassenge, 30 January 1940 – 31 July 1940
- Oberst Hans Seidemann, 5 October 1940 – 11 August 1942
- Generalmajor Paul Deichmann, 25 August 1942 – 25 June 1943
- Generalleutnant Ernst Müller, 1 October 1943 – September 1944
