= Fort de Guentrange =

Fort in Moselle, France

- Part of Thionville festen/Fortified group of Thionville
- Thionville, France
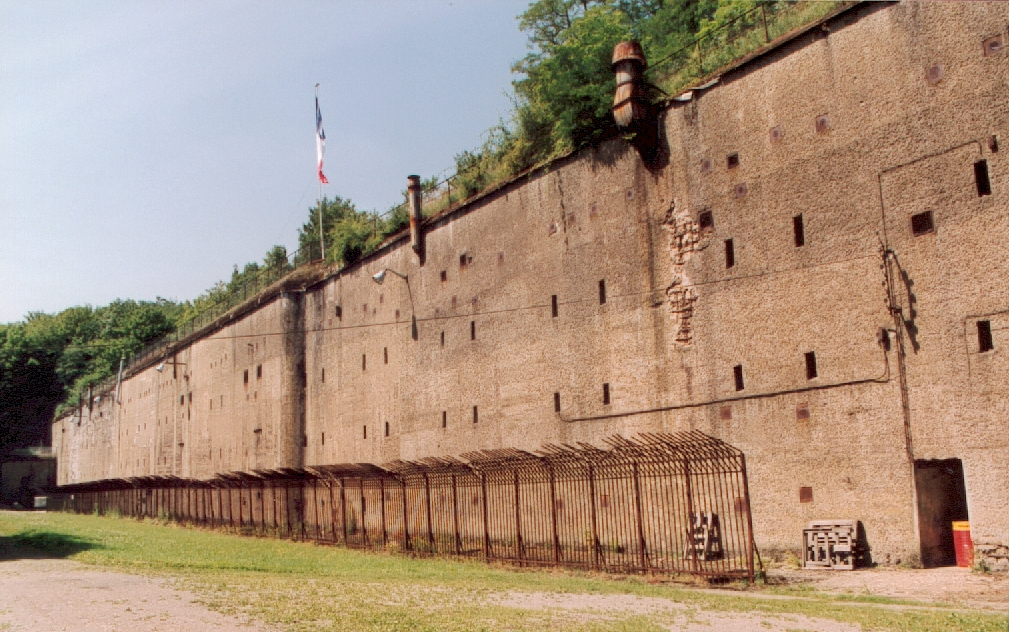
- The central barracks.

Site information
- Type: Fort, Moselstellung
- Owner: City of Thionville
- Controlled by: France
- Open to the public: Yes
- Condition: Preserved

Location
- Coordinates: 49.375639°N 6.131058°E

Site history
- Built: 1899
- Battles/wars: Lorraine Campaign

The Fort de Guentrange dominates Thionville in the Moselle department of France. It was built by Germany next to the town of the same name in the late 19th century after the annexation of the Moselle following the Franco-Prussian War. The Fort de Guentrange was part of the Moselstellung, a group of eleven fortresses surrounding Thionville and Metz to guard against the possibility of a French attack aimed at regaining Alsace and Lorraine, with construction taking place between 1899 and 1906. The fortification system incorporated new principles of defensive construction to deal with advances in artillery. Later forts, such as Guentrange, embodied innovative design concepts such as dispersal and concealment. The later forts were designed to support offensive operations, as an anchor for a pivoting move by German forces into France.

The Feste Ober-Gentringen, as Fort de Guentrange was called by the Germans, with the Fort de Koenigsmacker and Fort d'Illange, assured the protection of Thionville against French attack. Positioned to the rear of the principal lines of combat in the First World War, the fort never saw combat in that war. It is the largest of the three Thionville festen. The site overlooks the Moselle valley and its western approaches, as well as the railway lines to the west of Thionville.

== Description ==
The Fort de Guentrange is located about 4 kilometers (2.5 mi) to the northwest of Thionville on a hilltop overlooking the town and the northern railway line. It was defended by a garrison of 2000 men. Like the Fort de Plappeville on the heights of Metz, Fort Ober-Gentringen features two dispersed armored batteries, each armed with four short 100 mm guns in single turrets. It possesses a separate four-level barracks and about 3 kilometres (1.9 mi) of underground galleries. The austere simplicity of the fort's façade is characteristic of the forts of the era.

The dispersed, un-walled nature of the later Moselstellung was a significant innovation. Compared to the French Séré de Rivières system forts of the same era, later German fortifications such as Guentrange were scattered over a large area and enclosed chiefly by barbed wire. While certain individual elements presented imposing walls to an attacker, these walls were not continuous. The dispersed nature is evidenced by the official French name: the Groupe Fortifié de Guentrange (Fortified Group of Guentrange). These arrangements were studied and improved upon by the French in the construction of the Maginot Line.

The fort includes three separate fortified barracks along a north–south line, the central barracks being the largest. Each barracks was built into a hillside so that the rear are shielded by earth, while the top and front are protected by three of four meters of concrete, and are surmounted by a parapet. The two batteries are similarly constructed and linked to the barracks by tunnels. The four 100 mm guns in each battery were protected by Schumann turrets and controlled by an armored observation cupola on top of each battery. The whole was surrounded by deep networks of barbed wire, which were swept by fire from small perimeter blockhouses, also linked via the tunnel system. Further counterscarp casemates were built after 1912 when the defensive perimeter was expanded. The interior of the position was equipped with trenches for infantry. The barracks and batteries were further armored with reinforced concrete and armored windows. A variety of blockhouses and infantry shelters were also built in the intervals between forts. The fort featured central heating in the barracks and the armored batteries, as well as a central generating plant for electricity with eight diesel generators.

== Operational concept ==
From 1899, the Germans viewed Metz as a secure position that could provide an anchor for a pivoting movement into France from the Low Countries. This strategy, which would become known as the Schlieffen Plan, required that the Moselstellung deter an advance by French forces into Lorraine while the German forces mobilized.

== History ==
During World War I, Thionville was located well to the rear of German lines and never came under attack. With the Compiègne armistice of 1918, Lorraine was returned to France and the fort became French property. The three Thionville forts became known as the Fortified Group of Thionville.

See Fortified Sector of Thionville for a broader discussion of the Thionville sector of the Maginot Line.

The Fort de Guetrange was integrated into the Fortified Sector of Thionville of the Maginot Line in the 1930s, backing up the newer Maginot ouvrages that were built about halfway between Thionville and the border with Luxembourg. The short 105 mm guns were replaced by 105 mm long guns removed from the German fortifications of Metz. The artillery range was thus increased from 9,700 meters (6.0 mi) to 12,700 meters (7.9 mi). During the Battle of France the Thionville area was bypassed and encircled by German forces, with the Maginot and earlier fortifications seeing little action. After the 25 June 1940 armistice the German occupiers used the fort as a supply depot until Thionville was liberated by the Americans. The Fort de Guentrange was captured without resistance by elements of the U.S. 90th Infantry Division on 12 September 1944, after the German forces withdrew to Metz. After the war, the French Army used the fort as a munitions depot until 1971.

== Manning ==
Under the Germans, the Feste Obergentringen was occupied in 1909-10 by the 8th Fussartillerie (Foot Artillery) Regiment. From 1913, the garrison was provided by the 16th Fussartillerie. The French garrison of the Fort de Guentrange in 1939-40 was provided by detachments of the 168th Fortress Infantry Regiment and the 151st Position Artillery Regiment.

== Present status ==
The fort is the property of the city of Thionville and is maintained by the Amicale du Groupe Fortifié de Guentrange, which conducts guided visits.
