= Ouvrage Billig =

Gros ouvrage or large fortification of the Maginot Line

- Part of Maginot Line
- Northeast France
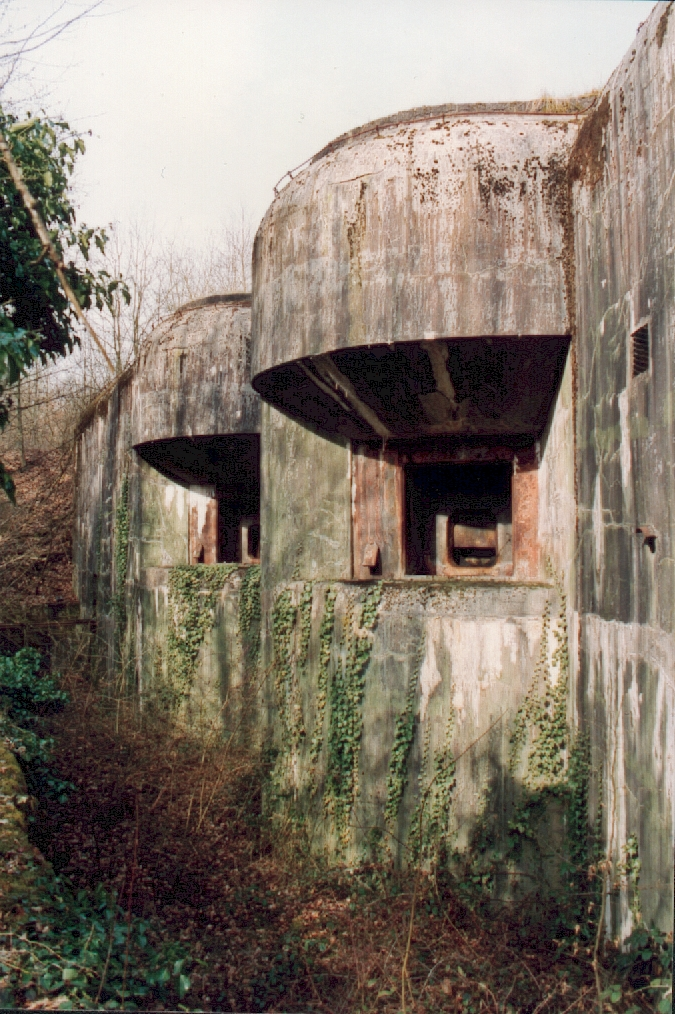
- Block 5 casemates

Site information
- Controlled by: France

Location
- Coordinates: 49.35°N 6.31667°E

Site history
- Built by: CORF
- In use: Abandoned
- Materials: Concrete, steel, deep excavation
- Battles/wars: Battle of France, Lorraine Campaign

Ouvrage Billig, a gros ouvrage or large fortification of the Maginot Line, was located in the Fortified Sector of Thionville, Moselle in northern France. It is located between the gros ouvrages Metrich and Hackenberg, facing Germany. It saw relatively little action during World War II and after a period of reserve duty in the 1950s, was abandoned in the 1970s.

== Design and construction ==
Billig was approved for construction by CORF (Commission d'Organisation des Régions Fortifiées), the Maginot Line's design and construction agency, in June 1930 and became operational by 1935, at a cost of 65 million francs. The contractor was Ossude of Paris.

== Description ==
This gros ouvrage (Note: English-language sources use the French term ouvrage as the preferred term for the Maginot positions, in preference to "fort", a term usually reserved for older fortifications with passive defensives in the form of walls and ditches. The literal translation of ouvrage in the sense of a fortification in English is "work." A gros ouvrage is a large fortification with a significant artillery component, while a petit ouvrage is smaller, with lighter arms.) is unusual in having one entrance for both ammunition and personnel. It lacks the large "M1" magazine of other gros ouvrages. The dogleg-shaped layout is relatively short for a gros ouvrage, with less than 1,000 metres (3,300 ft) of underground gallery at an average depth of 30 metres (98 ft) from the entrance to the farthest combat block. Like all gros ouvrages, Billig was provided with a 60 cm railway running through the gallery system to provide material. The railway continued out of the single entrance and connected to the railway system, paralleling the front in the rear zones.

- Mixed entry: Inclined ramp, two automatic rifle/anti-tank gun embrasures (JM/AC47). The mixed entry combines ammunition and personnel access, which is usually separated in a gros ouvrage.
- Block 1: Infantry block with one JM/AC47 embrasure, one machine gun embrasure (JM) and two automatic rifle cloches (GFM).
- Block 2: Infantry block with one machine gun turret and one GFM cloche.
- Block 3: Infantry block with one JM/AC37 embrasure, one JM embrasure and two GFM cloches.
- Block 4: Artillery block with two 75 mm gun embrasures, one 75 mm gun turret, one grenade launcher cloche (LG) and one GFM cloche.
- Block 5: Artillery block with two 75 mm gun embrasures and one GFM cloche.
- Block 6: Artillery block with 81 mm mortar turret and one GFM cloche.
- Block 7: Observatory block with one GFM cloche, one grenade launcher cloche and one periscope cloche (VDP).

=== Casemates and shelters ===
Several small blockhouses with machine guns and anti-tank guns were located around Billig. The Casernement d'Elzange provided peacetime above-ground barracks and support services to Billig and other ouvrages in the area.

== Manning ==
The manning of the ouvrage in 1940 comprised 521 men and 16 officers of the 167th Fortress Infantry Regiment and the 151st Position Artillery Regiment. The units were under the umbrella of the 42nd Fortress Corps of the 3rd Army, Army Group 2.

== History ==
See Fortified Sector of Thionville for a broader discussion of the events of 1940 in the Thionville sector of the Maginot Line.

Billig was not subjected to significant attacks by the Wehrmacht in 1940, although an aerial bomb penetrated the 81 mm mortar turret in Block 6 on 15 June, killing two. The area around Billig did not become active until late June 1940, but German infiltration persisted until the June 25 armistice. Billig fired 2030 75 mm shots in support of Hackenberg on the 24th. After the armistice, Billig was used by the Germans for explosive effects testing. Blocks 1 and 2 and the magazine of Block 5 were subjected to projectile penetration tests and gas explosions. Block 2's turret was blasted into the air, falling back into its opening.

Billig was assaulted by the U.S. 90th Infantry Division in September 1944 and captured after two days of fighting, using close-assault tactics. Following its capture, Billig was used for ordnance testing by the U.S. Army. Following the war, the Maginot Line was viewed as a means of slowing an advance by Warsaw Pact forces and most of the northeastern positions were renovated and rearmed. Replacement of 75 mm guns with 105 mm guns was proposed for Billig. However, the program was abandoned, and after a period of routine maintenance, Billig's status was lowered to inactive reserve, and finally abandoned.

Billig is abandoned and vandalised, with openings closed off to prevent access. The above-ground installations remain visible.

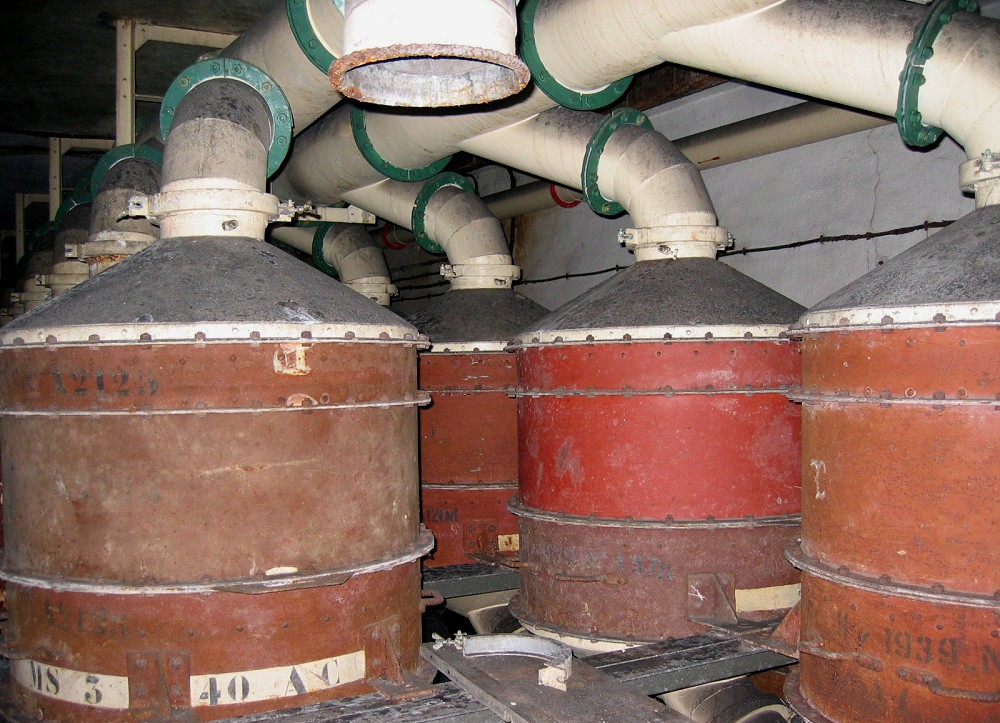
Filter room at the entrance to Ouvrage Billig in October 2004

== See also ==
- List of all works on Maginot Line
- Siegfried Line
- Atlantic Wall
- Czechoslovak border fortifications

== Bibliography ==
- Allcorn, William. The Maginot Line 1928-45. Oxford: Osprey Publishing, 2003. ISBN 1-84176-646-1
- Kaufmann, J.E. and Kaufmann, H.W. Fortress France: The Maginot Line and French Defenses in World War II, Stackpole Books, 2006. ISBN 0-275-98345-5
- Kaufmann, J.E., Kaufmann, H.W., Jancovič-Potočnik, A. and Lang, P. The Maginot Line: History and Guide, Pen and Sword, 2011. ISBN 978-1-84884-068-3
- Mary, Jean-Yves; Hohnadel, Alain; Sicard, Jacques. Hommes et Ouvrages de la Ligne Maginot, Tome 1. Paris, Histoire & Collections, 2001. ISBN 2-908182-88-2 (in French)
- Mary, Jean-Yves; Hohnadel, Alain; Sicard, Jacques. Hommes et Ouvrages de la Ligne Maginot, Tome 2. Paris, Histoire & Collections, 2003. ISBN 2-908182-97-1 (in French)
- Mary, Jean-Yves; Hohnadel, Alain; Sicard, Jacques. Hommes et Ouvrages de la Ligne Maginot, Tome 3. Paris, Histoire & Collections, 2003. ISBN 2-913903-88-6 (in French)
- Mary, Jean-Yves; Hohnadel, Alain; Sicard, Jacques. Hommes et Ouvrages de la Ligne Maginot, Tome 5. Paris, Histoire & Collections, 2009. ISBN 978-2-35250-127-5 (in French)
