= Cattenom Nuclear Power Plant =

Nuclear power plant located In Cattenom commune, France

- Cattenom Nuclear Power Plant
- Official name: Centrale nucléaire de Cattenom
- Country: France
- Location: Cattenom, Moselle, Grand Est
- Coordinates: 49°24′57″N 6°13′5″E
- Status: Operational
- Construction began: Unit 1: 29 October 1979; Unit 2: 28 July 1980; Unit 3: 15 June 1982; Unit 4: 28 September 1983
- Commission date: Unit 1: 1 April 1987; Unit 2: 1 February 1988; Unit 3: 1 February 1991; Unit 4: 1 January 1992
- Owner: EDF
- Operator: EDF

Nuclear power station
- Reactor type: PWR
- Reactor supplier: Framatome
- Cooling towers: 4 × Natural Draft
- Cooling source: Moselle River, Lac du Mirgenbach
- Thermal capacity: 4 × 3817 MW_{th}

Power generation
- Units operational: 4 × 1300 MW
- Make and model: P'4 REP 1300
- Nameplate capacity: 5200 MW
- Capacity factor: 80.65% (2017); 73.78% (lifetime)
- Annual net output: 36,739 GWh (2017)

External links
- Website: Centrale nucléaire de Cattenom
- Commons: Related media on Commons

The Cattenom Nuclear Power Plant is a nuclear power plant located in Grand Est in the Cattenom commune, France, on the Moselle River between Thionville (7 km upstream) and Trier (48 km downstream). It is close to the city of Luxembourg (22 km) and Metz (32 km). It is France's second most powerful nuclear power plant, and the twelfth largest nuclear power station in the world.

== Description ==
The site consists of 4 pressurized water reactors that were all built between 1979 and 1991 and have an electric output of 1300 MW each. The plant is a relatively modern and large nuclear power plant. In 2006 it produced the third most electricity (34 TWh) of the nuclear plants in France behind Gravelines (38.5 TWh) and Paluel (34.9 TWh).

The plant employs about 1200 regular employees and about 1000 more during outage times.

The station received its ISO 14001 certification in 2005, and gained its ISO 9001 and OHSAS 18001 in 2007.

=== Cooling ===
The site uses 4 separate cooling towers which use 890,000,000 m^{3} (3.1×10^{10} ft^{3}) of water from the Moselle annually. Additionally, a water reserve on site, Lake Mirgenbach, was created. The creation of this lake has led to the flooding of the subterranean portions of Ouvrage Kobenbusch, part of the Maginot Line. In 1985 an artificial lake was also created in the Pierre-Percée valley in the Vosges.

During the 2003 European heat wave the plant was permitted to pipe the waste heat water used for cooling directly into the Moselle river. The heating of the water in these cases is limited to 1.5 degrees Celsius by prefectoral decree. Heating to 2.2 degrees was accidentally caused once.

== Events ==
- In March 2001, the reactor building of Unit 3 was evacuated with 131 people, apparently due to a false alarm. No one was hurt and there were no radiation releases.
- Eight workers were exposed to radiation (6 workers at 1/100 of the annual regulatory limit) in March 2005.
- On 12 March 2008, an employee was exposed to about 1/20 of the annual maximum allowed dose.
- On 28 February 2013, two contract workers have died and a third seriously injured in an accident during maintenance work in a reactor building. They were working on a platform which appears to have become detached, dropping the workers several meters to the floor below.
- On 7 June 2013, the power transformer of unit 1 caught fire. The block turned itself off automatically and nobody was hurt.
- On 11 June 2013, the power transformer of unit 3 caught fire. Polychlorinated biphenyl has been used in the construction of the transformer, which is known to be toxic and carcinogenic when inhaled.
- On the evening of 31 January 2017, around 10pm, an administrative building caught fire. The reactors were not shut down and continued normal operation after the fire.

This list is not meant to be complete. The references include the official ASN list, which names 81 events between March 2000 and March 2008 (of which 7 are INES level 0, 57 are INES level 1 and 2 are INES level 2).

== Earthquake resistance ==
The Ministry for Ecology has declared the area around Cattenom to run a very low risk of earthquakes.

The Moselle prefect declared in late 2018, the area around Cattenom to have a very low risk of earthquakes.

== In the Media ==
The station is mentioned in Shadowrun, a fictional video game in which the facility undergoes a catastrophic nuclear meltdown, resulting in the release of a massive cloud of radioactive gas. In this imaginary adventure, the northern half of the province of Lorraine, the German state of Saarland and the entire nation of Luxembourg are evacuated, resulting in the creation of an exclusion zone known as the Saar-Lorraine-Luxembourg Special Administrative Zone, or S.O.X. The video game presents the S.O.X. as under direct control of mega-corporations and serving as a testing ground for the effects of radiation on the setting's magic.
