= Fort d'Illange =

Fortification in Moselle, France

- Part of Thionville festen/Fortified group of Thionville
- Thionville, France
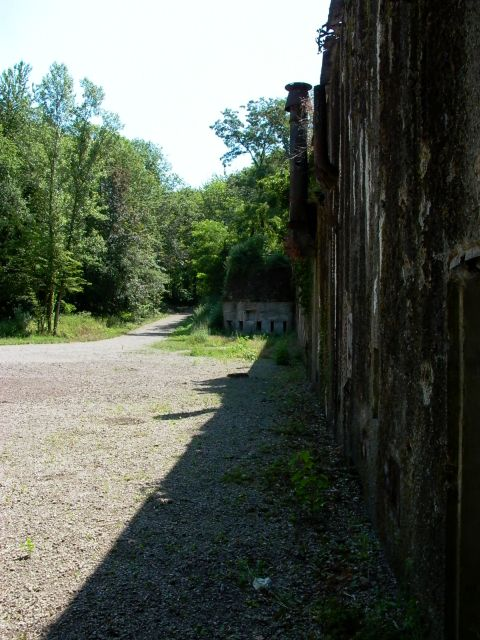
- Fort d'Illange

Site information
- Type: Fort, Moselstellung
- Controlled by: France
- Open to the public: Yes
- Condition: Abandoned, surface accessible

Location
- Coordinates: 49.33397°N 6.17674°E

Site history
- Built: 1905
- Battles/wars: Lorraine Campaign

The Fort d'Illange is a fortification located to the south of Thionville in the Moselle department of France. It was built by Germany next to the town of Illange in the early 20th century after the annexation of the Moselle following the Franco-Prussian War. The Fort d'Illange was part of the Moselstellung, a group of eleven fortresses surrounding Thionville and Metz to guard against the possibility of a French attack aimed at regaining Alsace and Lorraine, with construction taking place between 1905 and 1911. The fortification system incorporated new principles of defensive construction to deal with advances in artillery. Later forts, such as Illange, embodied innovative design concepts such as dispersal and concealment. These later forts were designed to support offensive operations, as an anchor for a pivoting move by German forces into France.

The Feste Illangen, as Fort d'Illange was called by the Germans, with Fort de Guentrange and Fort de Koenigsmacker, assured the protection of Thionville against French attack. Positioned to the rear of the principal lines of combat in the First World War, the fort never saw combat in that war, but was captured by advancing American forces in the Lorraine Campaign of World War II.

== Description ==
The Fort d'Illange is located about 4 kilometres (2.5 mi) to the south of Thionville on a hilltop overlooking the Moselle. It was defended by a garrison of 1200 men. Like the Fort de Koenigsmacker, Illange features an armoured battery, originally armed with four short 100 mm guns in single turrets. Four separate fortified barracks housed troop, with underground galleries connected the battery, barracks, and infantry positions.

The dispersed, un-walled nature of the later Moselstellung was a significant innovation. Compared to the French Séré de Rivières system forts of the same era, later German fortifications such as Illange were scattered over a large area and enclosed chiefly by barbed wire. While certain individual elements presented imposing walls to an attacker, these walls were not continuous. The dispersed nature is evidenced by the official French name: the Groupe Fortifié d'Illange (Fortified Group of Illange). These arrangements were studied and improved upon by the French in the construction of the Maginot Line.

Illange's fairly compact arrangement includes four dispersed fortified barracks built into a hillside so that their rears are shielded by earth, while the tops and fronts are protected by three of four metres of concrete, and are surmounted by parapets. The single battery is similarly constructed and linked to the barracks by tunnels at an average depth of 8 to 11 metres, about 800 metres (2,600 ft) in length. The four 100 mm guns in the battery were protected by Schumann turrets and controlled by two armored observation cupolas on top of the north and south barracks. The east and west barracks are also equipped with cupolas. The whole was surrounded by deep networks of barbed wire, which were swept by fire from small perimeter blockhouses, also linked via the tunnel system. The interior of the position was equipped with trenches for infantry. The barracks and batteries were further armoured with reinforced concrete and armored windows. A variety of blockhouses and infantry shelters were also built in the intervals between forts. The barracks and armored batteries featured central heating, while electricity was provided from a central utility plant equipped with five 45 hp diesel engines.

== Operational concept ==
From 1899, the Germans viewed Metz as a secure position that could provide an anchor for a pivoting movement into France from the Low Countries. This strategy, which would become known as the Schlieffen Plan, required that the Moselstellung deter an advance by French forces into Lorraine while the German forces mobilized.

== History ==
In 1905, Illange was completed in 1911 and saw no action during World War I, as Thionville remained well within German lines for the duration of the war. Feste Lillangen was the headquarters for the Thionville group of fortifications, under Generalleutnant von Lochow. With the Compiègne armistice of 1918, Lorraine was returned to France and the fort became French property. The three Thionville forts became known as the Fortified Group of Thionville.

See Fortified Sector of Thionville for a broader discussion of the Thionville sector of the Maginot Line.

The Fort d'Illange was integrated into the Fortified Sector of Thionville of the Maginot Line in the 1930s, serving as the sector's command post and backing up the newer Maginot ouvrages that were built about halfway between Thionville and the border with Luxembourg. The short 105 mm guns were replaced by 105 mm long guns removed from the German fortifications of Metz. The artillery range was thus increased from 9,700 metres (6.0 mi) to 12,700 meters (7.9 mi). During the Battle of France the Thionville area was bypassed and encircled by German forces, with the Maginot and earlier fortifications seeing little action.

In 1944, as the Fort de Koenigsmacker was being subdued to the north, the U.S. 95th Infantry Division approached Illange on 11 November 1944. An American soldier appeared under a white flag to request terms for evacuating the fort, but was told that the Germans would be required to surrender immediately. The Germans resisted and were kept under bombardment by heavy artillery through the night while combat engineers attacked the fort's openings with explosives. The fort surrendered the next morning.

== Present status ==
The fort is abandoned and stripped, but the grounds are accessible and have been administered as an open-air museum since 2003. The buildings and sub-surface works are sealed.
