= Gerhard Bassenge =

German general (1897-1977)

- Born: 18 November 1897; Ettlingen, Grand Duchy of Baden
- Died: 13 March 1977 (aged 79); Lübeck, Germany
- Military career
- Allegiance: German Empire (to 1918); Weimar Republic (to 1933); Nazi Germany
- Branch: Aviation
- Service years: 1914–47
- Rank: Generalmajor
- Units: Jagdstaffel 5; Jagdstaffel 2; Luftflotte 2; Luftflotte 5
- Commands: 19th Luftwaffe Field Division
- Conflicts: World War II: Battle of France; Battle of Britain; North African Campaign
- Awards: 1914 Iron Cross

Gerhard Bassenge was a general in the Luftwaffe of Nazi Germany during World War II. In the inter-war period, he worked at the Reich Air Ministry and was one of the German officers most responsible for training the first German paratroopers.

Bassenge was Chief of Staff of Luftflotte 2 as it was part of the Blitzkrieg into the Netherlands, Belgium, and France in 1940. He became Chief of Staff of Luftflotte 5 in Norway while it flew into the northern British isles in the Battle of Britain. After being part of a Luftwaffe mission to Romania, he took part in the North African Campaign in 1941 – 1943. He was captured there on 9 May 1943, and was held prisoner of war until 2 October 1947.

== From birth through World War I ==
Gerhard Bassenge was born in Ettlingen, the Grand Duchy of Baden in the German Empire on 18 November 1897.

Bassenge began his military career in the early days of World War I, on 4 October 1914, just shy of his 17th birthday. He became an Unteroffizier or noncommissioned officer; he was also a Fahnenjunker or officer candidate. He was assigned as a platoon leader in the Imperial German Army's 29th Infantry Regiment. He was then ranked as a Fahnrich or ensign, the most junior officer rank in the German Army. On 27 January 1915, while still only 17 years of age, he received a field promotion to Leutnant. While in the infantry, he served on both the Western Front and the Eastern Front.

=== Entry into aviation ===
He transferred to the Luftstreitkräfte and began pilot training on 1 April 1916. After training, he was assigned to Kampfstaffel 39. After serving with Kampfstaffel 39 for some months, Bassenge was remanded for further training.

On 17 January 1917 he began training as a fighter pilot. He was successful and was posted to a fighter squadron, Jagdstaffel 5. On 13 April, he put in his first claim for an aerial victory, over a British pusher fighter; the claim went unconfirmed because he only forced it to land. On 2 May, he was transferred to another fighter unit, the famed Jagdstaffel 2. He was confirmed as a leutnant on 28 June 1917; his commission granted him over two years seniority in rank, back to 18 June 1915. Photos taken of him at about this time show a slender man with an erect carriage standing next to or sitting on his Albatros D.III biplane fighter. This Albatros, as was the German custom, had been embellished beyond its factory finish of umber and two tones of green. As had all the Jasta 2 aircraft, its tail had been painted white. Its nose, cowling, struts, and wheel covers were painted gray. Bassenge's personal markings were superimposed–a black and white strip that ran back down the sides of the plane to where a wide black band edged in white encircled the fuselage.

Bassenge used this plane to score his first aerial victory on 20 October 1917. At 1220 hours, he shot down Sopwith Camel serial number B2370 from No. 70 Squadron RFC south of Saint Quentin, France. On 6 November, it was followed by Sopwith Camel s/n B2441 from No. 65 Squadron RFC, destroyed over Staden, Belgium. However, Bassenge was severely wounded. The wound would sideline him until July 1918.

Bassenge used a new Fokker D.VII fighter to demolish another Camel, number D8197, over Fere-en-Tardenois, France in the afternoon of 25 July 1918. There was a lull in his wins after that. He did not destroy another British plane until 27 September; this time, it was another first-line fighter that fell, a Royal Aircraft Factory SE.5a from No. 32 Squadron RAF that went down over Noyelles at 1735 hours. The following morning, at 0835 hours, it was Camel number F3220 from No. 203 Squadron RAF, destroyed between Ham and Lengelet. Less than a week later, he repeated his feat of back to back victories. On 4 October 1918, a SE.5a from No. 85 Squadron RAF fell over Joncourt, France; the next day, it was a Camel over Crèvecœur. Bassenge would not win again before the armistice, and would end the war with seven victories.

== Interwar period ==
In 1927, Bassenge completed his studies and was granted the title of Dip. Ing. or Certified Engineer. Simultaneously, he was transferred to the Reich Defense Ministry. In 1934, Bassenge transferred from the German Army to the Luftwaffe, which was then forming. His new assignment was as a consultant and Group Leader in the newly founded Reich Air Ministry. In 1937, Bassenge was assigned as Chief of Staff under Generalmajor Kurt Student.

On 1 June 1938, he was reassigned to the Reich Air Ministry and seconded to work for the Commander in Chief of the Luftwaffe. On 1 October 1938, he was returned for duty in the Air Ministry, working on the Luftwaffe General Staff. He was promoted to Oberst on 1 May 1939; a month later, with the world on the brink of World War II, Bassenge was appointed Chief of Staff of Air Zone Command XVII in Vienna, Austria.

== World War II ==
On 30 January 1940, Gerhard Bassenge was appointed Chief of Staff of Luftflotte 2 under General der Flieger Albert Kesselring. Luftflotte 2 was heavily involved in the Blitzkrieg of the Netherlands and Belgium, as it included General Student and his Fallschirmjäger. It was also the air support for the attack on the British Expeditionary Force that ended at the Battle of Dunkirk with its consequent evacuation. The Luftflotte then participated in the follow-up attack into France.

On 1 August 1940, Bassenge was transferred to be Chief of Staff of Luftflotte 5 in Oslo, Norway under Generaloberst Hans-Jürgen Stumpff. On 15 August, Luftflotte 5 became involved in the Battle of Britain, the first battle in history waged solely between opposing air forces. However, before that battle ended, Bassenge had once again been transferred; on 5 October 1940, he was appointed Chief of Staff of a Luftwaffe mission to Romania.

His next assignment took him to his final theater of service, North Africa. On 24 June 1941, he became the Airfield Area Commandant there. He would serve in that post until 1 October 1942, when he was named commanding officer of the 19th Luftwaffe Field Division. While serving in this post, he was promoted to Generalmajor on 1 January 1943. One month later, he was appointed to command Fortress Area Tunis-Bizerte, Tunisia

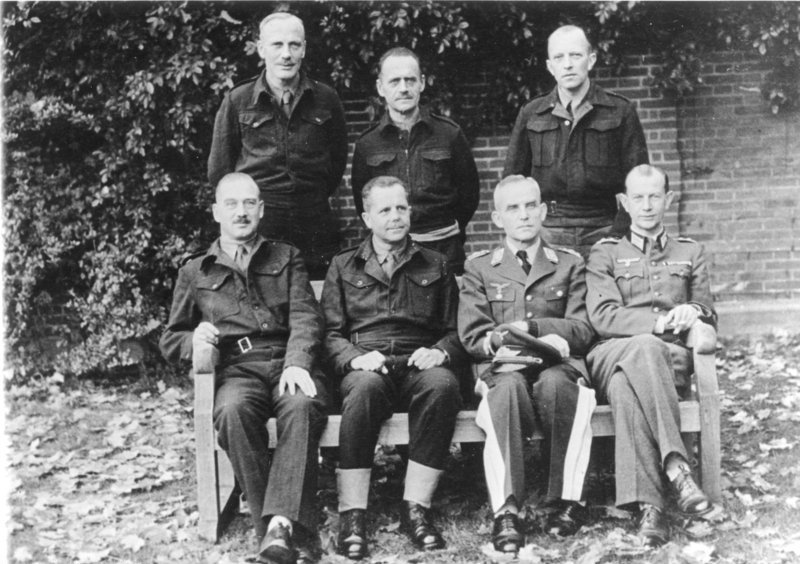
Gerhard Bassenge at Trent Park. back row from left to right: Otto Elfeldt, Ferdinand Heim, Gerhard Bassenge front row from left to right: Friedrich Freiherr von Broich, Heinrich Eberbach, Georg Neuffer, Hans Reimann.

Bassenge was captured 9 May 1943 at Metline, North Africa by the British. He was hastily transported to Britain, arriving at Camp 11, Trent Park, on 16 May 1943. He was logged into this luxurious camp for high-ranking prisoners as POW 18809. His intake papers note him as having brown hair and blue eyes, being 5' 7 1/2" tall, and weighing 162 lbs. His next of kin was listed as Lotte Bassenge. Camp 11 was "bugged" by British military intelligence, and on 10 July 1943, a wiretap caught Bassenge being informed of war crimes by a horrified Generalleutnant Georg Neuffer. It is not known if Bassenge was previously unaware of the atrocities, or if the conversation caught on the wiretap influenced him, but while in captivity, Bassenge became an advocate of Wilhelm Ritter von Thoma's views. General der Panzertruppe von Thoma, who was held prisoner along with Bassenge, believed that Hitler had gone insane and that the Nazi war effort was doomed. As the majority of German officers held prisoner were fervent Nazis, the views of Bassenge and Thoma caused considerable dissension with the Hitlerites. This schism among the German officers may have been responsible for Bassenge's transfer to Camp 300; he would be returned from there to Camp 11 on 23 July 1946. On 1 October 1947, he was transferred to Camp 186; he was repatriated the next day. Bassenge died in Lübeck, Germany on 13 March 1977.

== Awards ==
1. 1914 Iron Cross First Class with 1939 Bar
2. Romanian Order of Michael the Brave, Third Class on 19 September 1941 (per Royal Decree No. 2628)
3. German Cross in Gold on 15 July 1942 as Oberst im Generalstab in the General Staff of the Deutsche Luftwaffenmission Rumänien (German Air Force Mission Romania)
