= Kœnigsmacker =

- Commune
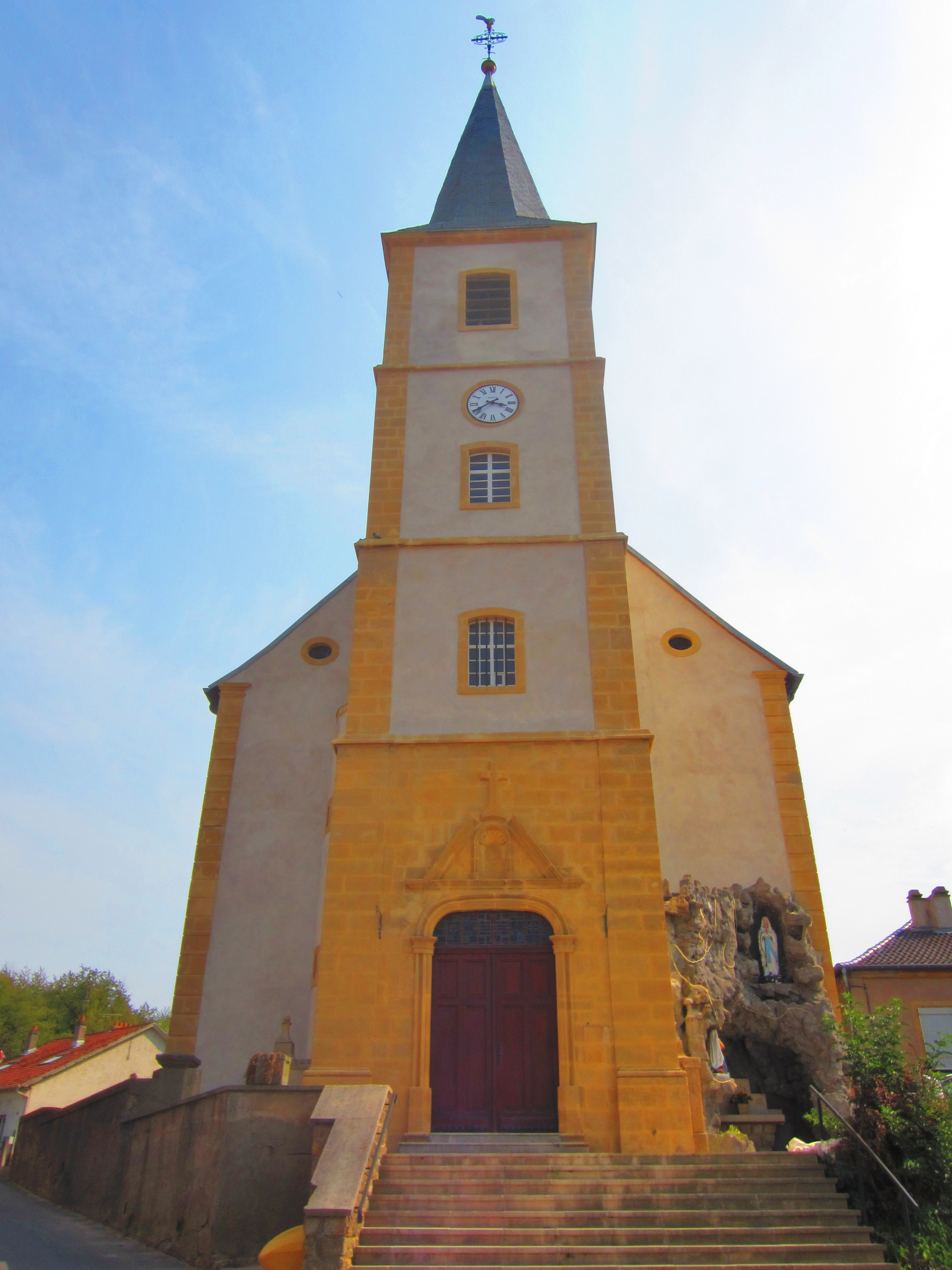
- The church in Kœnigsmacker

- Coat of arms
- Location of Kœnigsmacker
- Location within France Location within Grand Est
- Coordinates: 49°23′38″N 6°16′39″E
- Country: France
- Region: Grand Est
- Department: Moselle
- Arrondissement: Thionville
- Canton: Metzervisse
- Intercommunality: Arc mosellan

Government
  - Mayor (2020–2026): Pierre Zenner
- Area^{1}: 18.4 km^{2} (7.1 sq mi)
- Elevation: 150 m (490 ft)
- Highest elevation: 306 m (1,004 ft)
- Lowest elevation: 148 m (486 ft)
- Population (2023): 2,224
  - Density: 121/km^{2} (313/sq mi)
- Time zone: UTC+01:00 (CET)
  - Summer (DST): UTC+02:00 (CEST)
- INSEE/Postal code: 57370 /57970
- ^{1} French Land Register data, which excludes lakes, ponds, glaciers > 1 km^{2} (0.386 sq mi or 247 acres) and river estuaries.

Kœnigsmacker (French pronunciation: [kœniksmakəʁ]; Lorraine Franconian: Maacher/Kinneksmaacher; German: Königsmachern) is a commune in the Moselle department in Grand Est in north-eastern France.

Kœnigsmacker was the birthplace of Father Jean-Vincent Scheil (1858–1940), a French Dominican scholar and Assyriologist, who was one of the discoverers of the Code of Hammurabi in Persia. The area was the scene of fighting during World War II when the U.S. 90th Infantry Division assaulted the nearby Fort de Koenigsmacker, one of the German Moselstellung fortresses.

== Population ==
Historical population
Year	Pop.	±% p.a.
1968	1,439	—
1975	1,556	+1.12%
1982	1,603	+0.43%
1990	1,722	+0.90%
1999	1,893	+1.06%
2007	2,010	+0.75%
2012	2,155	+1.40%
2017	2,244	+0.81%
2023	2,224	−0.15%
Source: INSEE

== See also ==
- Communes of the Moselle department
