= Cattenom =

- Commune
- Nuclear power plant

- Coat of arms
- Location of Cattenom
- Location within France Location within Grand Est
- Coordinates: 49°25′00″N 6°15′00″E
- Country: France
- Region: Grand Est
- Department: Moselle
- Arrondissement: Thionville
- Canton: Yutz
- Intercommunality: Cattenom et Environs

Government
  - Mayor (2020–2026): Bernard Zenner
- Area^{1}: 25.47 km^{2} (9.83 sq mi)
- Population (2023): 2,580
  - Density: 101/km^{2} (262/sq mi)
- Time zone: UTC+01:00 (CET)
  - Summer (DST): UTC+02:00 (CEST)
- INSEE/Postal code: 57124 /57570
- ^{1} French Land Register data, which excludes lakes, ponds, glaciers > 1 km^{2} (0.386 sq mi or 247 acres) and river estuaries.

Cattenom (French pronunciation: [katnɔm]; Luxembourgish: Kettenuewen; German: Kattenhofen) is a commune in the Moselle department in Grand Est in north-eastern France.

== Geography ==
It lies about 8 kilometres north of Thionville. The localities of Homeldange, Husange (aka Hussange) and Sentzich are incorporated in the commune.

== Population ==
Historical population
Year	Pop.	±% p.a.
1968	1,851	—
1975	2,374	+3.62%
1982	2,209	−1.02%
1990	2,190	−0.11%
1999	2,272	+0.41%
2007	2,549	+1.45%
2012	2,749	+1.52%
2017	2,654	−0.70%
2023	2,580	−0.47%
Source: INSEE

== Toponymy ==
Former names: Cathenem (1182), Kettenem (1214), Kettenhem (1329), Kettenheim (1400), Kerthenhem (1426), Katenem (1432), Kettenheim (1481), Keluchem / Ketenhon / Cetenhem / Kentuchen / Kettenoffen (1544), Kettenhoven (1568-1570), Cettenhouen (1589), Kattenhous (1594), Catnum (16th century), Katenom (1668), Catnom (1685), Kethenoven (1686), Cattenom (1793).

== Nuclear power station ==
Cattenom is well known for its nuclear power plant, which was built from 1987 to 1992. An artificial lake has been introduced to cool the four nuclear reactors. The creation of this lake has led to the flooding of Ouvrage Kobenbusch, part of the Maginot Line.

== See also ==
- Communes of the Moselle department
