= 19th Grenadier Division =

19th Grenadier Division: 19. Grenadier-Division
- Active: August 1944 – October 1944
- Country: Nazi Germany
- Branch: Army
- Type: Infantry
- Size: Division
- Engagements: World War II

The 19th Grenadier Division (German: 19. Grenadier-Division) of the German Army in World War II was formed in October 1944 from the depleted 19. Luftwaffen-Sturm-Division ("19th Air Forces Assault Division"), which was transferred to the Heer ("Army") and renamed 19. Volksgrenadier-Division ("19th People's Grenadier Division") .

== Commanders ==
- Oberst (later General-Major) Gerhard Bassenge : 1 October 1942 – 1 February 1943
- Generalleutnant Otto Elfeldt (? August 1944 – ? August 1944)
- Generalleutnant Walter Wißmath (? August 1944 – 9 October 1944)

== Area of operations ==
- Denmark (August 1944 – September 1944)
- France (September 1944 – October 1944)

== Order of battle ==
- Grenadier Regiment 59.
- Grenadier Regiment 73.
- Grenadier Regiment 74.
- Artillery Regiment 719.
- 1. Battalion
- 2. Battalion
- 3. Battalion
- 4. Battalion
- Panzerjäger Battalion 119.
- Signals Battalion 119.
- Engineer Battalion 119.
- Supply troops

== Sources ==
- Mitcham, Samuel W. Jr. German Order of Battle, Volume Two: 291st–999th Infantry Divisions, Named Divisions, and Special Divisions in WWII. Stackpole Books, 2007.
- NARA T312R1319 (KTB of AOK 2)
- Scherzer, Veit (2007). Deutsche Truppen im Zweiten Weltkrieg: Formationsgeschichte des Heeres und des Ersatzheeres 1939–1945 (in German). Vol. 1A. Scherzers Militaer-Verlag. ISBN 978-3-938845-07-3.
- Stout, Michael J. (2026). Goering's Ground Troops: The Luftwaffe Field Divisions of World War II. Naval Institute Press. ISBN 978-1-68247-977-3.
