= AC 37 anti-tank gun =

Form of anti-tank artillery

AC 37
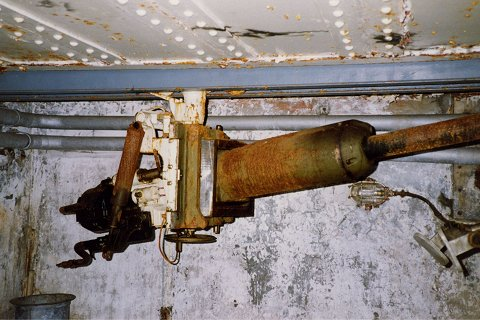
- A 37mm gun of Ouvrage Simserhof
- Type: Anti-tank
- Place of origin: France

Service history
- In service: 1930s
- Used by: France
- Wars: World War II

Production history
- Designer: Ateliers de Puteaux

Specifications
- Caliber: 37 mm (1.45 in)
- Barrels: Single
- Rate of fire: 20 rounds per minute
- Muzzle velocity: 850 metres per second (2,800 ft/s)

The AC 37 was a French anti-tank gun of 37mm caliber, developed by the Ateliers de Puteaux. It was principally used in the ouvrages and casemates of the Maginot Line in the late 1930s. It was frequently paired with a Jumelage de Mitrailleuses (JM) cupola with twin machine guns.

The AC 37 was superseded by the AC 47 anti-tank gun.

== Characteristics ==
- Length of tube : 1.97 m (6.46 ft)
- Rifling: 16, right-handed
- Penetration at 1000m : 30 to 40 mm
