= Ouvrage Galgenberg =

Ouvrage of the Maginot Line

- Part of Maginot Line
- North-East France
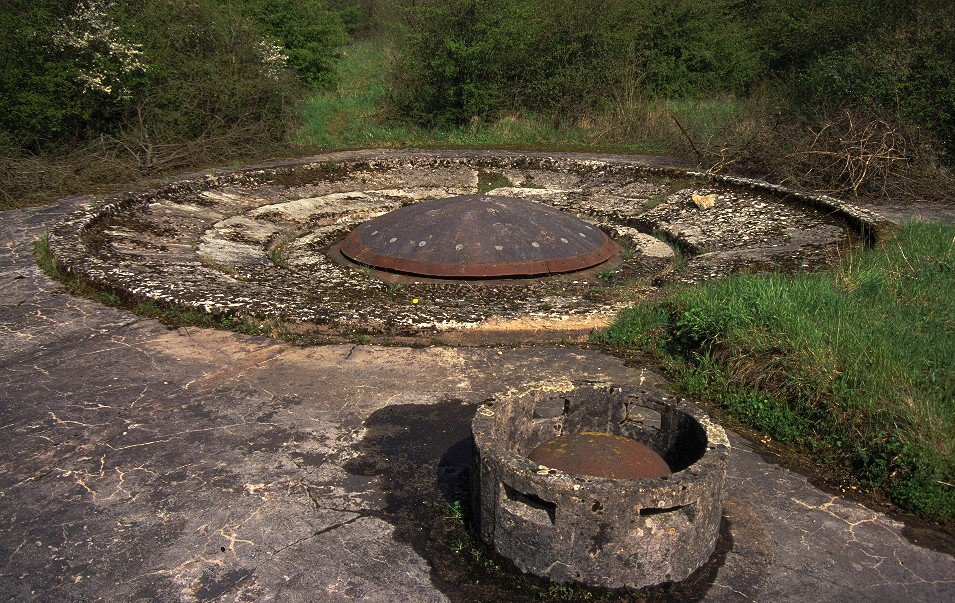
- 135mm gun turret, Galgenberg, May 2001

Site information
- Controlled by: France
- Open to the public: Yes
- Condition: Preserved

Location
- Coordinates: 49.42472°N 6.2525°E

Site history
- Built: CORF
- Materials: Concrete, steel, deep excavation
- Battles/wars: Battle of France, Lorraine Campaign

Ouvrage Galgenberg forms a portion of the Fortified Sector of Thionville of the Maginot Line. It is situated in the Cattenom Forest, near the gros ouvrage Kobenbusch and petit ouvrage Oberheid. The ouvrage was tasked with controlling the Moselle Valley and as such was called the "Guardian of the Moselle." Galgenberg did not see significant action in 1940 or 1944. After a period of reserve duty in the 1950s and 1960s, it was deactivated. It is now a museum.

== Design and construction ==
The Galgenberg site was surveyed by the Commission d'Organisation des Régions Fortifiées (CORF), the Maginot Line's design and construction agency, in 1930. Work began the next year, and the position became operational in 1935, at a cost of 48 million francs. The contractor was Verdun-Fortifications. The site occupies the heights of the Galgenberg. Ouvrage Sentzich is close by the side of the Galgenberg massif, overlooking the town of Sentzich and the road to the north.

== Description ==
The ouvrage (Note: English-language sources use the French term ouvrage as the preferred term for the Maginot positions, in preference to "fort", a term usually reserved for older fortifications with passive defensives in the form of walls and ditches. The literal translation of ouvrage in the sense of a fortification in English is "work." A gros ouvrage is a large fortification with a significant artillery component, while a petit ouvrage is smaller, with lighter arms.) comprises two entries and six combat blocks:

- Ammunition entry: at grade, two automatic rifle cloches (GFM) and one machine gun/47 mm anti-tank gun (JM/AC47) embrasure.
- Personnel entry: shaft, one GFM cloche and one JM/AC47 embrasure.
- Block 1: Infantry block with one JM/AC47 embrasure and one GFM cloche.
- Block 2: Infantry block with one JM/AC47 embrasure, one JM embrasure, and two GFM cloches.
- Block 3: Infantry block with machine gun turret and one GFM cloche.
- Block 4: Artillery block with 81 mm mortar turret and one GFM cloche.
- Block 5: Observation block with one GFM cloche, one machine gun cloche (JM), and one observation cloche (VDP).
- Block 6: Artillery block with 135 mm gun turret, one grenade launcher cloche (LG) and one GFM cloche.

Galgenberg has a small "M1" main magazine compared to other gros ouvrages.

=== Casemates and shelters ===
The Observatoire de Cattenom is located behind Galgenberg, near the Casernement de Cattenom, which provided above-ground peacetime quarters for the garrisons of the nearby ouvrages. The observation point was armed with one GFM cloche and an observation cloche. Flanking Galgenberg to the north is the Casemate du Sonnenberg, armed with one JM/AC37 embrasure, one JM embrasure and one GFM cloche. None of these are connected to the ouvrage or to each other. All were built by CORF

== Manning ==
The 445 men and 15 officers of the 167th Fortress Infantry Regiment (RIF) and the 151st Position Artillery Regiment (RAP) were under the orders of Captain Guillaume de la Teyssoniére. The units were under the umbrella of the 42nd Fortress Corps of the 3rd Army, Army Group 2. The Casernement de Cattenom provided peacetime above-ground barracks and support services to Galgenberg and other ouvrages in the area.

== History ==
See Fortified Sector of Thionville for a broader discussion of the events of 1940 in the Thionville sector of the Maginot Line.

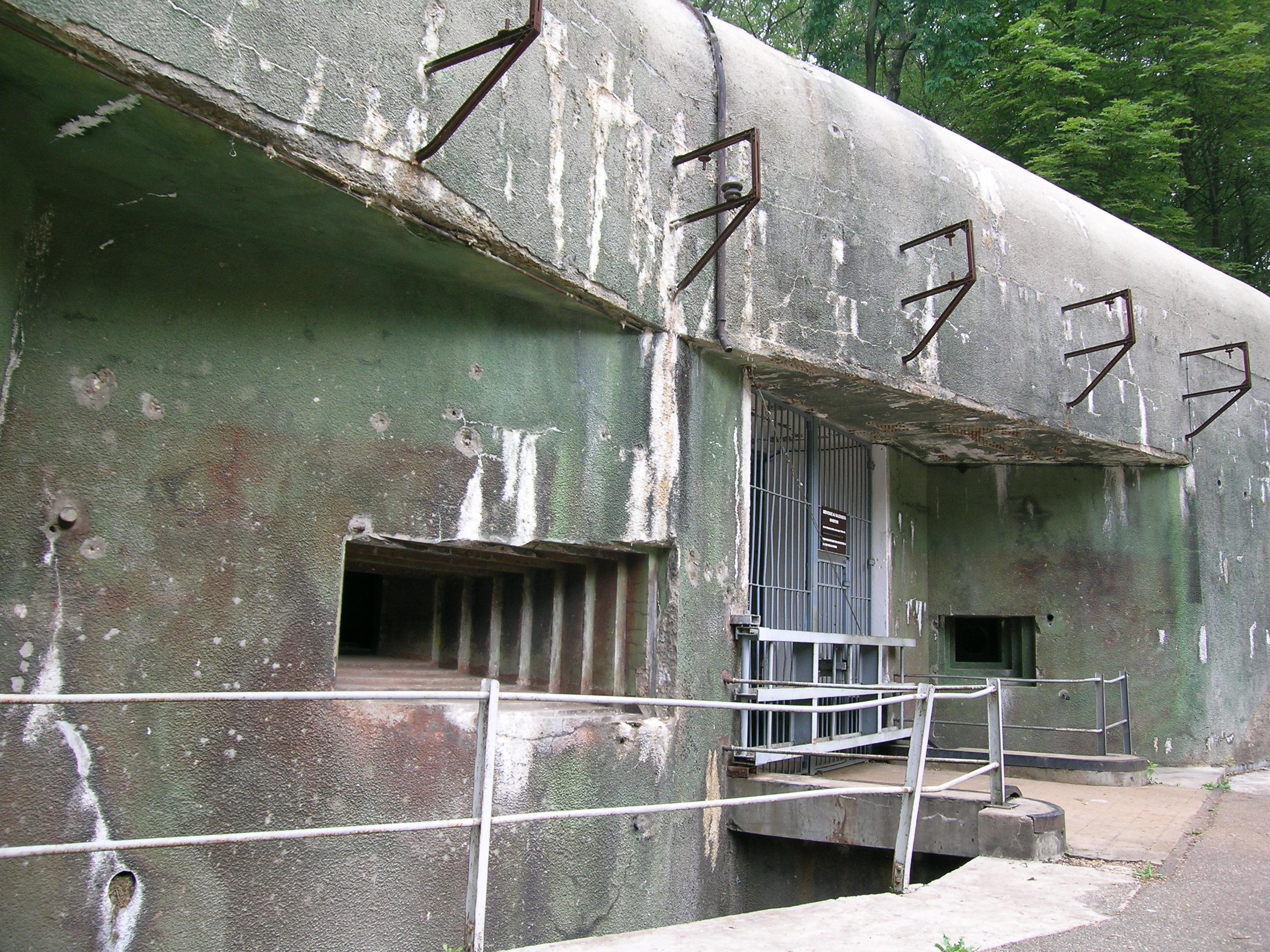
Munitions entrance, Ouvrage Galgenberg

Galgenberg did not see significant action in the Battle of France in 1940, nor in the Lorraine Campaign of 1944. In 1940 Galgenberg fired on German infiltrators in the area. An accident with an 81 mm mortar projectile damaged a mortar tube on 14 June 1940, which was repaired after three days. The Germans largely bypassed the valley of the Moselle, advancing along the valley of the Meuse and Saar rivers, threatening the rear of the Thionville sector. An order to fortress troops by sector commander Colonel Jean-Patrice O'Sullivan to prepare for withdrawal on 17 June was reversed by O'Sullivan. The garrison therefore remained in place. Following negotiations, the positions on the left bank of the Moselle finally surrendered to the Germans on 30 June 1940.

=== Renovation ===
In the 1950s the French government became concerned about a possible invasion by the Warsaw Pact through Germany. The Maginot Line, while obsolete in terms of its armament, was viewed as a series of useful deeply buried and self-sufficient shelters in an era of air power and nuclear weapons. A number of the larger ouvrages were selected to form defensive ensembles or môles around which a defence might be organised and controlled. Galgenberg was nominated as a communications station, in concert with the command posts at Rochonvillers, Soetrich and Molvange.

== Current condition ==
The ouvrage has been maintained by the Association Ligne Maginot du Secteur Fortifié du Bois de Cattenom (LMSFBC), which also maintains Bois Karre, since 1987 and portions of the ouvrage are open to visits during the summer months. The combat blocks are not accessible, but work is continuing to restore the fortification.

== See also ==
- List of all works on Maginot Line
- Siegfried Line
- Atlantic Wall
- Czechoslovak border fortifications

== Bibliography ==
- Allcorn, William. The Maginot Line 1928-45. Oxford: Osprey Publishing, 2003. ISBN 1-84176-646-1
- Degon, André; Zylberyng, Didier, La Ligne Maginot: Guide des Forts à Visiter, Editions Ouest-France, 2014. ISBN 978-2-7373-6080-0 (in French)
- Kaufmann, J.E. and Kaufmann, H.W. Fortress France: The Maginot Line and French Defenses in World War II, Stackpole Books, 2006. ISBN 0-275-98345-5
- Kaufmann, J.E., Kaufmann, H.W., Jancovič-Potočnik, A. and Lang, P. The Maginot Line: History and Guide, Pen and Sword, 2011. ISBN 978-1-84884-068-3
- Mary, Jean-Yves; Hohnadel, Alain; Sicard, Jacques. Hommes et Ouvrages de la Ligne Maginot, Tome 1. Paris, Histoire & Collections, 2001. ISBN 2-908182-88-2 (in French)
- Mary, Jean-Yves; Hohnadel, Alain; Sicard, Jacques. Hommes et Ouvrages de la Ligne Maginot, Tome 2. Paris, Histoire & Collections, 2003. ISBN 2-908182-97-1 (in French)
- Mary, Jean-Yves; Hohnadel, Alain; Sicard, Jacques. Hommes et Ouvrages de la Ligne Maginot, Tome 3. Paris, Histoire & Collections, 2003. ISBN 2-913903-88-6 (in French)
- Mary, Jean-Yves; Hohnadel, Alain; Sicard, Jacques. Hommes et Ouvrages de la Ligne Maginot, Tome 5. Paris, Histoire & Collections, 2009. ISBN 978-2-35250-127-5 (in French)
