= Ouvrage Anzeling =

Ouvrage of the Maginot Line

- Part of Maginot Line
- Northeast France
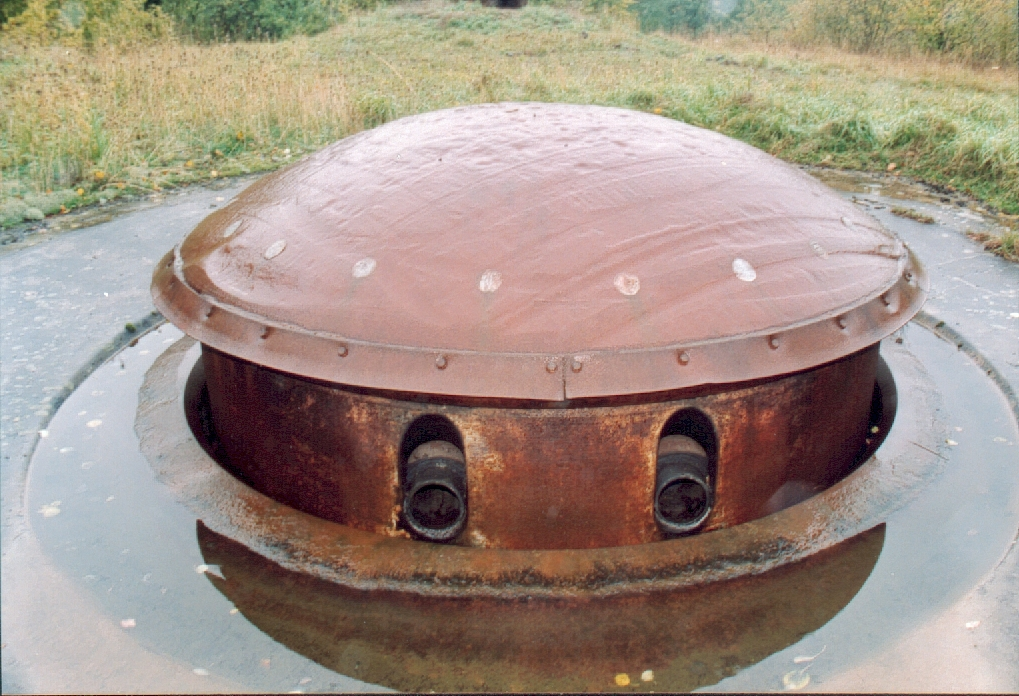
- 135mm gun turret at Anzeling

Site information
- Controlled by: France

Location
- Coordinates: 49.25°N 6.45°E

Site history
- Built: 1930–1938
- Built by: CORF
- In use: Private
- Materials: Concrete, steel, deep excavation
- Battles/wars: Battle of France

Ouvrage Anzeling is a gros ouvrage of the Maginot Line, part of the Fortified Sector of Boulay. It is located between petit ouvrage Bousse and petit ouvrage Berenbach, facing Germany just to the east of Bockange. With one of the longest main galleries of any Maginot position, it consists of two entrance blocks, three infantry blocks and four artillery blocks. A second phase of construction was planned to add nine more combat blocks and an anti-tank ditch, but was never executed. Anzeling saw limited action in World War II, and was rehabilitated for use during the cold war. It was de-activated in the 1970s and sold for private use.

== Design and construction ==
The site was surveyed by CORF (Commission d'Organisation des Régions Fortifiées), the Maginot Line's design and construction agency; Anzeling was approved for construction in May 1931. It was completed at a cost of 122 million francs by the contractor La Parisienne d'Enterprises. The gros ouvrage (Note: English-language sources use the French term ouvrage as the preferred term for the Maginot positions, in preference to "fort", a term usually reserved for older fortifications with passive defensives in the form of walls and ditches. The literal translation of ouvrage in the sense of a fortification in English is "work." A gros ouvrage is a large fortification with a significant artillery component, while a petit ouvrage is smaller, with lighter arms.) is of the typical fort palmé ("palm-shaped") form for a large position. The fort palmé is a distributed fortification, with its entrances and underground support areas more than a kilometer to the rear, connected to the combat blocks by a long underground gallery. The "palm" is composed of the grouped combat blocks, linked by galleries to the main trunk.

== Description ==
Anzeling comprises two entrance blocks, three infantry blocks, and four artillery blocks. The combat blocks are connected to the entries and support areas by a gallery system extending about 3,000 metres (9,800 ft) from end to end, one of the longest in the Line. The munitions and personnel entries are located far to the rear of the compactly arranged combat blocks. An "M1" ammunition magazine is located just inside the ammunition entry, while the underground barracks are located at the junction of the two entry galleries. From there a long gallery runs at an average depth of 30 metres (98 ft) to the combat blocks. Anzeling was served by a 60 cm-gauge narrow-gauge railway, which enters at the munitions entrance and runs all the way out through the galleries to the combat blocks. On the surface, the railway connects to supply points to the rear and to other ouvrages. Block 5 is unusual, as it mounts a 135mm howitzer in a façade embrasure, as well as the more usual twin mount in a turret. Anzeling also features a mixed-arms turret in Block 9, equipped with a machine gun and a 50mm grenade launcher that could fire when retracted.

- Block 1: infantry block with two automatic rifle cloches (GFM), one retractable machine gun turret, 47mm anti-tank gun (JM/AC47) embrasure and one twin machine gun embrasure.
- Block 2: infantry block with two GFM cloches and one retractable 81mm twin morar turret.
- Block 3: infantry block with one GFM cloche and one machine gun turret.
- Block 4: artillery block with two GFM cloches, one grenade launcher cloche (LG) and one 75mm twin gun turret.
- Block 5: artillery block with two GFM cloches, one retractable 135mm gun turret and one 135mm gun embrasure.
- Block 6 (unbuilt): Infantry block with one machine gun turret planned for Phase 2.
- Block 7: artillery block with one GFM cloche and one 75mm twin gun turret.
- Block 8 (unbuilt): Artillery block with one 75mm gun turret, planned for phase 2.
- Block 9: artillery block with one GFM cloche, one retractable mixed-arms turret, one twin machine gun embrasure and one JM/AC47 embrasure.
- Block 10 (unbuilt): Flanking casemate defending an anti-tank ditch, similar to those at Hackenberg and Hochwald, planned for Phase 2 with blocks 11 and 12, none connected to the gallery system.
- Block 11 (unbuilt): see above.
- Block 12 (unbuilt): see above.
- Block 15 (unbuilt): Unbuilt observation block.
- Block 16: (unbuilt): Advanced position, phase 2.
- Block 17: (unbuilt): Advanced position, phase 2.
- Block 18: (unbuilt): Advanced position, phase 2.
- Personnel entry: Entry block armed with two GFM cloches, one LG cloche and one JM/AC47 embrasure.
- Munitions entry: Inclined entry block armed with one GFM cloche and one JM/AC47 embrasure.

Anzeling also features a unique chimney or ventilator for its generating plant. Called the fosse aux ours, or "bear pit", the ventilation block was large enough to merit its own mixed-arms turret.

=== Casemates and shelters ===
- Abri de Bockange: Surface abri (Note: An abri is an infantry shelter, sometimes underground or under earth cover. An abri in the main Maginot Line often closely resembles a casemate, but is more lightly armed and can hold more occupants.) with two GFM cloches and a command post.

== Manning ==
The 1939 manning of the ouvrage under the command of Commandant Guillebot comprised 609 men and 23 officers of the 162nd Fortress Infantry Regiment and the 152nd Position Artillery Regiment. The units were under the umbrella of the 3rd Army, Army Group 2. The nearby Casernement de Bockange provided peacetime above-ground barracks and support services to Anzeling and other positions in the area.

== History ==
See Fortified Sector of Boulay for a broader discussion of the Boulay sector of the Maginot Line.

=== 1940 ===
No attempt was made in June 1940 by the Germans to directly attack this central portion of the Maginot Line, the Germans preferring to go around the west end of the Line and take the Line from the rear. On 15 June the German 1st Army broke through the Line at the Saar and pushed west and east along the Line, enveloping the French armies. From the night of 15 June there was heavy German patrol activity in the area. Positions in the Boulay sector received notice that they may be required to evacuate their positions, and began to sabotage equipment. The following day remained quiet, while the evacuation notice was reversed. German patrols increased on the 17th. Anzeling fired on German forces on the surface of ouvrage Bousse, causing some damage to the installation. During the night of 17–18 June, German troops appear on the surface of Anzeling blocks 1 and 3 and to the rear of the ouvrage. The next day infiltrators were spotted between Anzeling and Berenbach. On 19–20 June Anzeling came under 105 mm and 155 mm artillery fire. Anzeling provided covering fire to Denting and Bovenberg. On the 22nd a German party came to the entry for a parley, asking for the surrender of the ouvrage, which was refused. Anzeling provided covering fire for Mont des Welches. Intermittent firing continued on the 23rd from both sides. The 24th was quiet, with supporting fire for Mont des Welches. As a result of the armistice of 25 June 1940, a cease-fire went into effect of 25 June. During the following days the minefields surrounding the ouvrage were removed and the commandant negotiated terms for a surrender. On 3 July Anzeling surrendered to German forces. In the following years under German occupation, Anzeling was used as a bombproof factory.

=== Cold War ===
Following World War II, interest revived in the use of the Maginot Line to defend against a possible Soviet advance through southern Germany. Funds were allocated for restoration of the gros ouvrages, with most of the position's equipment and armament restored. Funding was not forthcoming for upgrades to heavier arms, and work was limited to restoration of systems and improvements to existing armament. The renovations did not include the command post or the barracks. By 1956, Anzeling had been designated part of the Mòle de Boulay, a strongpoint in the northeastern defenses against Soviet attack. By the late 1950s interest in fixed fortifications was waning after France developed a nuclear deterrent. The money needed to maintain and upgrade the fortifications was diverted for the nuclear programs. Anzeling was maintained for use by the Army until 1972, and finally abandoned in the 1970s.

In the 1980s Anzeling was used for the cultivation of mushrooms. Some of its equipment has been removed for display in other Maginot ouvrages that are open to the public.

== Current condition ==
The M1 magazine is reportedly used as a shooting range by the gendarmerie and by local sports clubs.

== See also ==
- List of all works on Maginot Line
- Siegfried Line
- Atlantic Wall
- Czechoslovak border fortifications

== Bibliography ==
- Allcorn, William. The Maginot Line 1928-45. Oxford: Osprey Publishing, 2003. ISBN 1-84176-646-1
- Kaufmann, J.E. and Kaufmann, H.W. Fortress France: The Maginot Line and French Defenses in World War II, Stackpole Books, 2006. ISBN 0-275-98345-5
- Kaufmann, J.E., Kaufmann, H.W., Jancovič-Potočnik, A. and Lang, P. The Maginot Line: History and Guide, Pen and Sword, 2011. ISBN 978-1-84884-068-3
- Mary, Jean-Yves; Hohnadel, Alain; Sicard, Jacques. Hommes et Ouvrages de la Ligne Maginot, Tome 1. Paris, Histoire & Collections, 2001. ISBN 2-908182-88-2 (in French)
- Mary, Jean-Yves; Hohnadel, Alain; Sicard, Jacques. Hommes et Ouvrages de la Ligne Maginot, Tome 2. Paris, Histoire & Collections, 2003. ISBN 2-908182-97-1 (in French)
- Mary, Jean-Yves; Hohnadel, Alain; Sicard, Jacques. Hommes et Ouvrages de la Ligne Maginot, Tome 3. Paris, Histoire & Collections, 2003. ISBN 2-913903-88-6 (in French)
- Mary, Jean-Yves; Hohnadel, Alain; Sicard, Jacques. Hommes et Ouvrages de la Ligne Maginot, Tome 5. Paris, Histoire & Collections, 2009. ISBN 978-2-35250-127-5 (in French)
