= Fortified region (disambiguation) =

Fortified region or Fortified Region may refer to:

- Fortified district, a fortification concept of the Soviet Army
- Fortified Region of Metz, France
- Fortified region of Belfort, France
