= Ouvrage Michelsberg =

- Part of Maginot Line
- Northeast France
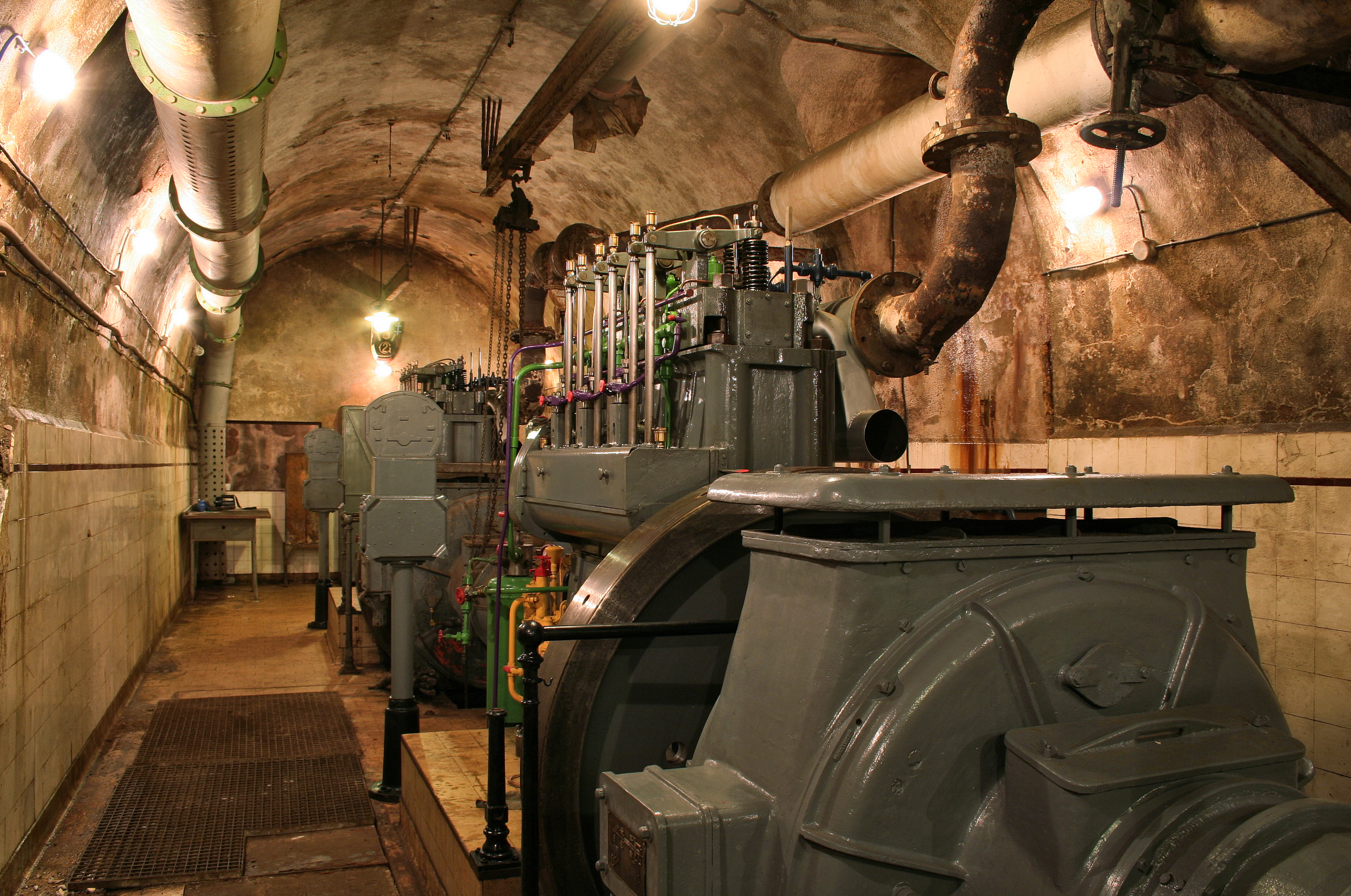
- View of the usine

Site information
- Controlled by: France
- Open to the public: Yes

Location
- Coordinates: 49.30258°N 6.41861°E

Site history
- In use: Preserved
- Materials: Concrete, steel, deep excavation
- Battles/wars: Battle of France

Ouvrage Michelsberg, one of the Maginot Line fortifications, formed part of the Fortified Sector of Boulay as well as the fortified region of Metz. The ouvrage is located in Moselle (département) between the towns of Dalstein and d'Ebersviller, about 23 km from Thionville. It is located between gros ouvrage Mont des Welches and petit ouvrage Hobling, facing Germany. Michelsberg did not see significant action in the Battle of France until June 1940, when it was attacked from the rear by German forces that had bypassed the Maginot Line. It successfully resisted these attacks, but was compelled to surrender in accordance with the 25 June 1940 armistice. After the Second World War it was renovated as a Cold War fortification against a potential Soviet invasion, then abandoned. It is now operated as a museum, and may be visited.

== Design and construction ==
Michelsberg was approved for construction by the Commission d'Organisation des Régions Fortifiées (CORF), the Maginot Line's design and construction agency, in April 1930 and became operational by 1935, at a cost of 56 million francs. The contractor was Gianotti of Nice. Unlike virtually all other Maginot positions, the ouvrage does not have a drinking water well inside the position: the intended well was dry, forcing the ouvrage to rely on a well outside.

== Description ==
Michelsberg is a gros ouvrage (Note: English-language sources use the French term ouvrage as the preferred term for the Maginot positions, in preference to "fort", a term usually reserved for older fortifications with passive defenses in the form of walls and ditches. The literal translation of ouvrage in the sense of a fortification in English is "work." A gros ouvrage is a large fortification with a significant artillery component, while a petit ouvrage is smaller, with lighter arms.), arranged in a linear fashion along a central underground gallery connecting the single combined personnel/ammunition entry block to the rear with the combat blocks about 800 metres (2,600 ft) to the east. It lacks a central "M1" ammunition magazine. It does possess an electrified 60 cm internal rail network, used to move supplies and munitions within the ouvrage. The galleries are excavated at an average depth of up to 30 metres (98 ft).

- Mixed entry: inclined plan, one automatic rifle cloche (GFM), three automatic rifle embrasures and one machine gun/47mm anti-tank gun embrasure (JM/AC47).
- Block 1: Infantry block with one retractable machine gun turret, one GFM cloche and one machine gun cloche (JM).
- Block 2: Infantry block with one machine gun/anti-tank gun embrasure (JM/AC47), machine gun embrasure (JM) and two GFM cloches.
- Block 3: Artillery block with one retractable 81mm mortar turret and two GFM cloches.
- Block 4 (unbuilt): Planned artillery block with an 81mm mortar turret.
- Block 5: Artillery block with one 75mm gun turret and one GFM cloche.
- Block 6: Artillery block with one 135mm gun turret, one GFM cloche, one grenade launcher cloche (LG), oneJM cloche and one emergency exit cloche (unique in the Line).

Apart from the emergency egress cloche, Michelsberg also features a false turret.

=== Casemates and shelters ===
In addition to the connected combat blocks, a series of detached casemates and infantry shelters surround Michelsberg, including

- Abri de Bilmette: Surface infantry shelter (abri) (Note: An abri is an infantry shelter, sometimes underground or under earth cover. An abri in the main Maginot Line often closely resembles a casemate, but is more lightly armed and can hold more occupants.) with two GFM cloches.
- Casemate de Huberbusch Nord: SIngle block with one JM/AC37 embrasure, one JM embrasure and one GFM cloche.
- Casemate de Huberbusch Sud: SIngle block with one JM/AC37 embrasure, one JM embrasure and two GFM cloches.

== Manning ==
The manning of the ouvrage in June 1940 comprised 472 men and 19 officers of the 164th Fortress Infantry Regiment and the 153rd Position Artillery Regiment, commanded by Commandant Pelletier. The units were under the umbrella of the 42nd Fortress Corps of the 3rd Army, Army Group 2.

The Casernement de Férange provided peacetime above-ground barracks and support services to Michelsberg and other positions in the area.

== History ==
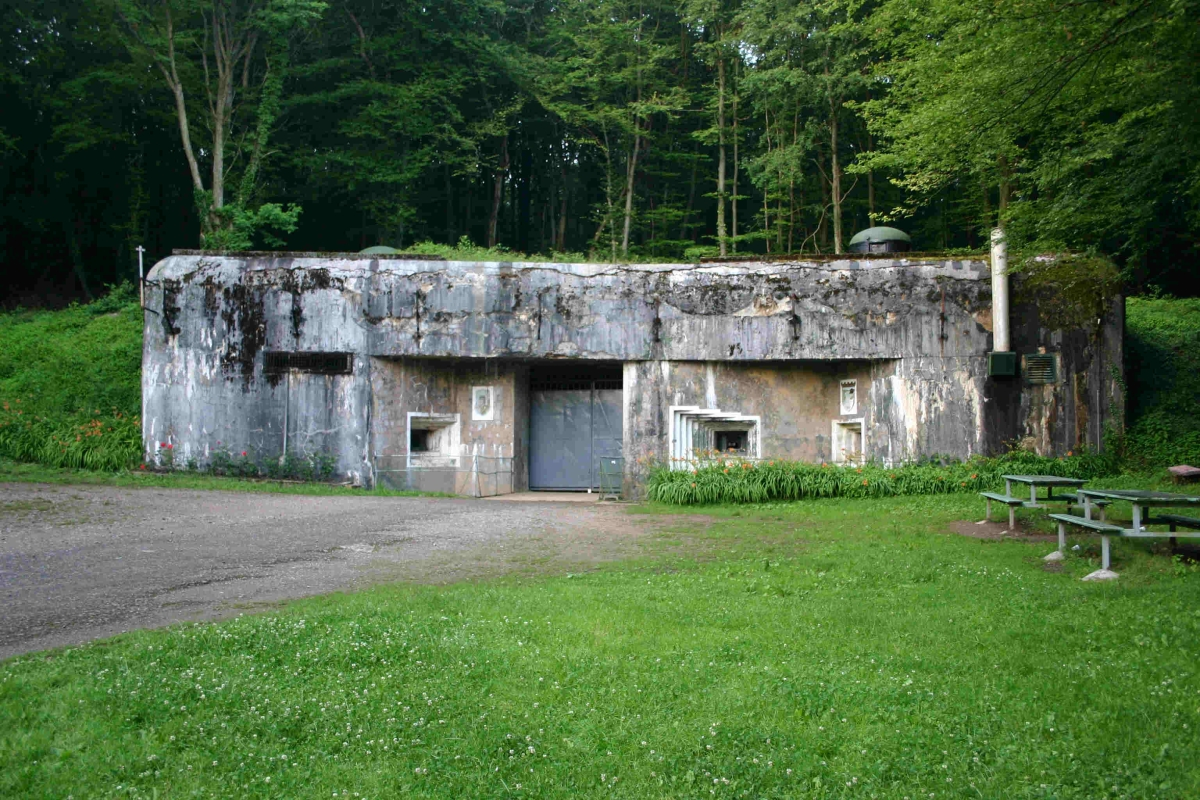
Michelsberg entrance block

See Fortified Sector of Boulay for a broader discussion of the Boulay sector of the Maginot Line.

=== 1940 ===
On 15 June the German 1st Army broke through the Line at the Saar and pushed west and east along the Line, enveloping the French armies, meeting forces of the German 16th Army that had gone around the Line in the west in May. On 15 June Michelsberg fired 753 75mm rounds against the Germans. Troops of the German 95th Infantry Division moved behind Michelsberg on 21 June, taking fire from blocks 3 and 6. The ouvrage repulsed a full German attack on 22 June 1940, with help from Mont des Welches and Hackenberg. German artillery hit Block 3's cloches and the façade of Block 2. Block 6 destroyed a German battery with artillery fire. Following the Second Armistice at Compiègne on 25 June, the Boulay sector's garrisons surrendered on 4 July 1940. In the following years under German occupation, Michelsberg was used as a bombproof factory.

=== 1944 ===
During the Lorraine Campaign only Hackenberg was occupied by the Germans; Michelsberg played no role in that campaign. German forces did attempt to blow up the position when they evacuated, detonating explosives in the main gallery.

=== Cold War ===
Following World War II, interest revived in the use of the Maginot Line to defend against a possible Soviet advance through southern Germany. Funds were allocated for restoration of the gros ouvrages Work was limited to restoration of systems and improvements to existing armament. The renovations did not include the command post or the barracks. By 1956, Michelsberg had been designated part of the Mòle de Boulay, a strongpoint in the northeastern defenses against Soviet attack. By the late 1950s interest in fixed fortifications was waning after France developed a nuclear deterrent. The money needed to maintain and upgrade the fortifications was diverted for the nuclear programs. Michelsberg was maintained for use by the Army until 1971 when it was placed in second-class reserve.

After being abandoned, the ouvrage was used between 1978 and 1988 for the cultivation of mushrooms. The ouvrage was damaged and vandalized during this time. Renovations and repairs started in 1992 and are ongoing. Since 1993 it has been protected by a charitable organization that allows visits on Sundays between April and September, inclusive. The volunteers are also restoring the nearby Abri de Bilmette.

== See also ==
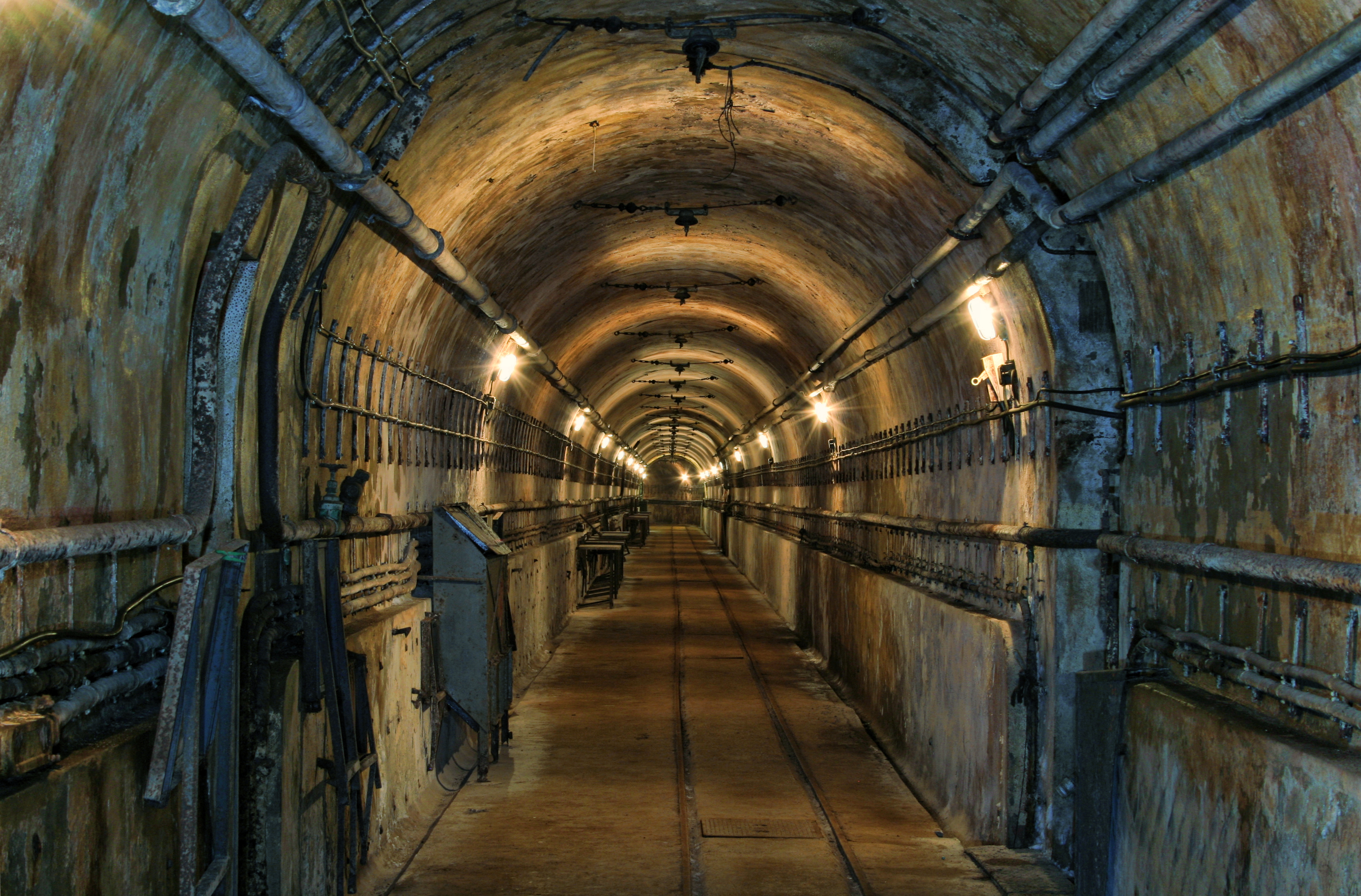
Main gallery, showing the 60cm internal rail line

- List of all works on Maginot Line
- Siegfried Line
- Atlantic Wall
- Czechoslovak border fortifications

== Bibliography ==
- Allcorn, William. The Maginot Line 1928-45. Oxford: Osprey Publishing, 2003. ISBN 1-84176-646-1
- Degon, André; Zylberyng, Didier, La Ligne Maginot: Guide des Forts à Visiter, Editions Ouest-France, 2014. ISBN 978-2-7373-6080-0 (in French)
- Kaufmann, J.E. and Kaufmann, H.W. Fortress France: The Maginot Line and French Defenses in World War II, Stackpole Books, 2006. ISBN 0-275-98345-5
- Kaufmann, J.E., Kaufmann, H.W., Jancovič-Potočnik, A. and Lang, P. The Maginot Line: History and Guide, Pen and Sword, 2011. ISBN 978-1-84884-068-3
- Mary, Jean-Yves; Hohnadel, Alain; Sicard, Jacques. Hommes et Ouvrages de la Ligne Maginot, Tome 1. Paris, Histoire & Collections, 2001. ISBN 2-908182-88-2 (in French)
- Mary, Jean-Yves; Hohnadel, Alain; Sicard, Jacques. Hommes et Ouvrages de la Ligne Maginot, Tome 2. Paris, Histoire & Collections, 2003. ISBN 2-908182-97-1 (in French)
- Mary, Jean-Yves; Hohnadel, Alain; Sicard, Jacques. Hommes et Ouvrages de la Ligne Maginot, Tome 3. Paris, Histoire & Collections, 2003. ISBN 2-913903-88-6 (in French)
- Mary, Jean-Yves; Hohnadel, Alain; Sicard, Jacques. Hommes et Ouvrages de la Ligne Maginot, Tome 5. Paris, Histoire & Collections, 2009. ISBN 978-2-35250-127-5 (in French)
