= Ouvrage Berenbach =

Lesser work (petit ouvrage) of the Maginot Line

- Part of Maginot Line
- Northeast France

Site information
- Controlled by: France
- Condition: Abandoned

Location
- Coordinates: 49.23333°N 6.45°E

Site history
- Materials: Concrete, steel
- Battles/wars: Battle of France

Ouvrage Berenbach, also known as Ouvrage Behrenbach, is a lesser work (petit ouvrage) of the Maginot Line. Located in the Fortified Sector of Boulay, the ouvrage is located between gros ouvrage Anzeling and petit ouvrage Bovenberg, facing Germany. The ouvrage consists of two infantry blocks and one observation block. Uniquely, the blocks are not connected by subterranean galleries, as is the case in virtually all other Maginot fortifications.

== Design and construction ==
The site was surveyed by CORF (Commission d'Organisation des Régions Fortifiées), the Maginot Line's design and construction agency; Berenbach was approved for construction in August 1930. It was completed at a cost of 11 million francs by the contractor La Parisienne d'Enterprises. The petit ouvrage (Note: English-language sources use the French term ouvrage as the preferred term for the Maginot positions, in preference to "fort", a term usually reserved for older fortifications with passive defensives in the form of walls and ditches. The literal translation of ouvrage in the sense of a fortification in English is "work." A gros ouvrage is a large fortification with a significant artillery component, while a petit ouvrage is smaller, with lighter arms.) was planned as an annex to Anzeling.

== Description ==
Berenbach comprises three separate infantry blocks. Blocks 1 and 2 were planned for the deep underground gallery system to come in Phase 2. Since there was no central usine, each block has its own generating plant.

- Block 1: infantry block with two automatic rifle cloches (GFM), one retractable twin machine gun turret, three automatic rifle embrasures, one twin machine gun embrasure and one machine gun/anti-tank gun embrasure (JM/AC47). The block has a shaft excavated to access the gallery system proposed for the second phase, but no staircase in the shaft. Power provided by two 30 hp Renault generators.
- Block 2: Infantry block with one GFM cloche, two automatic rifle embrasures, one twin machine gun embrasure and one JM/AC47 embrasure. The block has a shaft excavated to access the gallery system proposed for the second phase, already equipped with a staircase. Power provided by two 8 hp Renault generators.
- Block 3: infantry/observation block with one observation cloche (VDP), one GFM cloche and two automatic rifle embrasures. Power provided by two 8 hp Renault generators.

=== Casemates and shelters ===
In addition to the combat blocks, a series of detached casemates and infantry shelters surround Berenbach, including

- Abri de Colming: Surface abri-casemate (Note: An abri is an infantry shelter, sometimes underground or under earth cover. An abri in the main Maginot Line often closely resembles a casemate, but is more lightly armed and can hold more occupants.), a unique position in the Maginot Line, with two GFM cloches and with one JM/AC47 embrasure. The position was sited to control the defensive inundation of Gomelange that protected the low-lying area between Berenbach and Bovenberg.
- Abri de Gomelange: Surface abri with two GFM cloches.

== Manning ==
The 1940 manning of the ouvrage under the command of Captain Ramaud comprised 97 men and 2 officers of the 162nd Fortress Infantry Regiment. The units were under the umbrella of the 3rd Army, Army Group 2. The Casernement de Bockange provided peacetime above-ground barracks and support services to Berenbach and other positions in the area.

== History ==
See Fortified Sector of Boulay for a broader discussion of the Boulay sector of the Maginot Line.

Berenbach played no significant role in either the Battle of France in 1940 or the Lorraine Campaign of 1944. After the Second World War it became part of the Mòle de Boulay, a strongpoint in the northeastern defenses against Soviet attack. Berenbach remained under Army control until after 1971, when it was declassified and sold.

== Current condition ==
The ouvrage has been stripped of much of its equipment and is in poor condition.

== See also ==
- List of all works on Maginot Line
- Siegfried Line
- Atlantic Wall
- Czechoslovak border fortifications

== Bibliography ==
- Allcorn, William. The Maginot Line 1928-45. Oxford: Osprey Publishing, 2003. ISBN 1-84176-646-1
- Kaufmann, J.E. and Kaufmann, H.W. Fortress France: The Maginot Line and French Defenses in World War II, Stackpole Books, 2006. ISBN 0-275-98345-5
- Kaufmann, J.E., Kaufmann, H.W., Jancovič-Potočnik, A. and Lang, P. The Maginot Line: History and Guide, Pen and Sword, 2011. ISBN 978-1-84884-068-3
- Mary, Jean-Yves; Hohnadel, Alain; Sicard, Jacques. Hommes et Ouvrages de la Ligne Maginot, Tome 1. Paris, Histoire & Collections, 2001. ISBN 2-908182-88-2 (in French)
- Mary, Jean-Yves; Hohnadel, Alain; Sicard, Jacques. Hommes et Ouvrages de la Ligne Maginot, Tome 2. Paris, Histoire & Collections, 2003. ISBN 2-908182-97-1 (in French)
- Mary, Jean-Yves; Hohnadel, Alain; Sicard, Jacques. Hommes et Ouvrages de la Ligne Maginot, Tome 3. Paris, Histoire & Collections, 2003. ISBN 2-913903-88-6 (in French)
- Mary, Jean-Yves; Hohnadel, Alain; Sicard, Jacques. Hommes et Ouvrages de la Ligne Maginot, Tome 5. Paris, Histoire & Collections, 2009. ISBN 978-2-35250-127-5 (in French)
