= Ouvrage Coucou =

Lesser work (petit ouvrage) of the Maginot Line

- Part of Maginot Line
- Northeast France
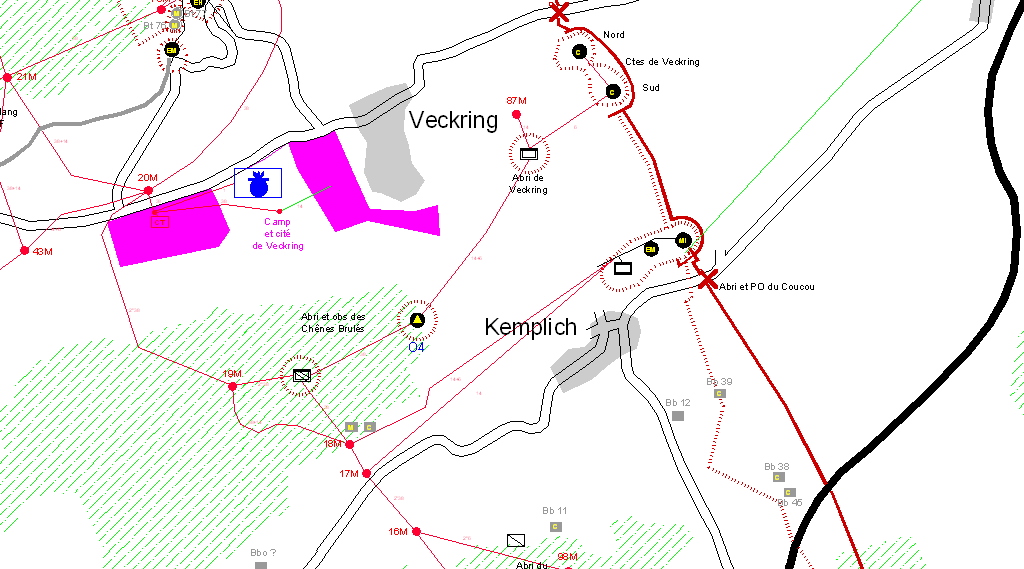
- Situation map of the work of Le Coucou

Site information
- Owner: Private
- Controlled by: France
- Open to the public: No

Location
- Coordinates: 49.33333°N 6.39306°E

Site history
- Materials: Concrete, steel, deep excavation
- Battles/wars: Battle of France, Lorraine Campaign

Ouvrage Coucou is a lesser work (petit ouvrage) of the Maginot Line, located in the Fortified Sector of Boulay. The ouvrage consists of two infantry blocks, and is located between the gros ouvrages of Hackenberg and Mont des Welches, facing Germany, just north of Kemplich.

== Design and construction ==
Coucou was approved for construction by CORF (Commission d'Organisation des Régions Fortifiées), the Maginot Line's design and construction agency, in June 1930 and became operational by 1935, at a cost of 12 million francs. The contractor was Enterprise de Travaille de Fortification.

== Description ==
Coucou is a petit ouvrage (Note: English-language sources use the French term ouvrage as the preferred term for the Maginot positions, in preference to "fort", a term usually reserved for older fortifications with passive defenses in the form of walls and ditches. The literal translation of ouvrage in the sense of a fortification in English is "work." A gros ouvrage is a large fortification with a significant artillery component, while a petit ouvrage is smaller, with lighter arms.) with two combat blocks, overlooking the village of Kemplich. The blocks are linked by an underground gallery with barracks and a utility area (usine). The galleries are excavated at an average depth of up to 30 metres (98 ft).

- Block 1: infantry/entry block with one automatic rifle cloche (GFM), three automatic rifle embrasures and one 37mm anti-tank gun (JM/AC37) embrasure.
- Block 2: infantry block with two GFM cloches, one retractable machine gun turret, two machine gun embrasures and one 47mm anti-tank gun (JM/AC47) embrasure.

In addition, the ouvrage was linked to the Abri du Coucou (Note: An abri is an infantry shelter, sometimes underground or under earth cover. An abri in the main Maginot Line often closely resembles a casemate, but is more lightly armed and can hold more occupants.) by an 80-metre (260 ft) underground gallery. The above-ground infantry shelter was armed with two GFM cloches and five automatic rifle embrasures. It possessed its own generating plant. Other nearby posts include:

- Abri des Chênes-Brûlés: Subterranean infantry shelter (abri-caverne) with two GFM cloches.
- Observatoire des Chênes-Brûlés: Observation post with one VP observation cloche and one GFM cloche, reporting to Mont-des-Welches.

An observation block was planned for a second phase, never executed, directly over the caserne.

== Manning ==
In June 1940 the garrison comprised 113 men and 3 officers of the 164th Fortress Infantry Regiment (RIF). The commanding officer was Chef d'Escadron Ebrard until 13 June 1940, succeeded by Captain Roques.

The Casernement de Veckring provided peacetime above-ground barracks and support services to Coucou and other positions in the area.

== History ==
See Fortified Sector of Boulay for a broader discussion of the Boulay sector of the Maginot Line.

Coucou played no significant role in either the Battle of France in 1940 or the Lorraine Campaign of 1944. After the Second World War it became part of the Mòle de Boulay, a strongpoint in the northeastern defenses against Soviet attack. Coucou remained under Army control until after 1971, when it was declassified and sold.

== Current ==
The property is privately owned.

== See also ==
- List of all works on Maginot Line
- Siegfried Line
- Atlantic Wall
- Czechoslovak border fortifications

== Bibliography ==
- Allcorn, William. The Maginot Line 1928-45. Oxford: Osprey Publishing, 2003. ISBN 1-84176-646-1
- Kaufmann, J.E. and Kaufmann, H.W. Fortress France: The Maginot Line and French Defenses in World War II, Stackpole Books, 2006. ISBN 0-275-98345-5
- Kaufmann, J.E., Kaufmann, H.W., Jancovič-Potočnik, A. and Lang, P. The Maginot Line: History and Guide, Pen and Sword, 2011. ISBN 978-1-84884-068-3
- Mary, Jean-Yves; Hohnadel, Alain; Sicard, Jacques. Hommes et Ouvrages de la Ligne Maginot, Tome 1. Paris, Histoire & Collections, 2001. ISBN 2-908182-88-2 (in French)
- Mary, Jean-Yves; Hohnadel, Alain; Sicard, Jacques. Hommes et Ouvrages de la Ligne Maginot, Tome 2. Paris, Histoire & Collections, 2003. ISBN 2-908182-97-1 (in French)
- Mary, Jean-Yves; Hohnadel, Alain; Sicard, Jacques. Hommes et Ouvrages de la Ligne Maginot, Tome 3. Paris, Histoire & Collections, 2003. ISBN 2-913903-88-6 (in French)
- Mary, Jean-Yves; Hohnadel, Alain; Sicard, Jacques. Hommes et Ouvrages de la Ligne Maginot, Tome 5. Paris, Histoire & Collections, 2009. ISBN 978-2-35250-127-5 (in French)
