= Fortified Sector of Boulay =

The Fortified Sector of Boulay (Secteur Fortifiée de Boulay) was the French military organization that in 1940 controlled the section of the Maginot Line to the north and east of Metz in northeastern France. The left (western) wing of the Boulay sector was among the earliest and strongest portions of the Maginot Line. The right wing, started after 1931, was progressively scaled back in order to save money during the Great Depression. It was attacked in 1940 by German forces in the Battle of France. Despite the withdrawal of the mobile forces that supported the fixed fortifications, the sector successfully fended off German assaults before the Second Armistice at Compiègne. The positions and their garrisons finally surrendered on 27 June 1940. Following the war many positions were reactivated for use during the Cold War. Three locations are now preserved and open to the public.

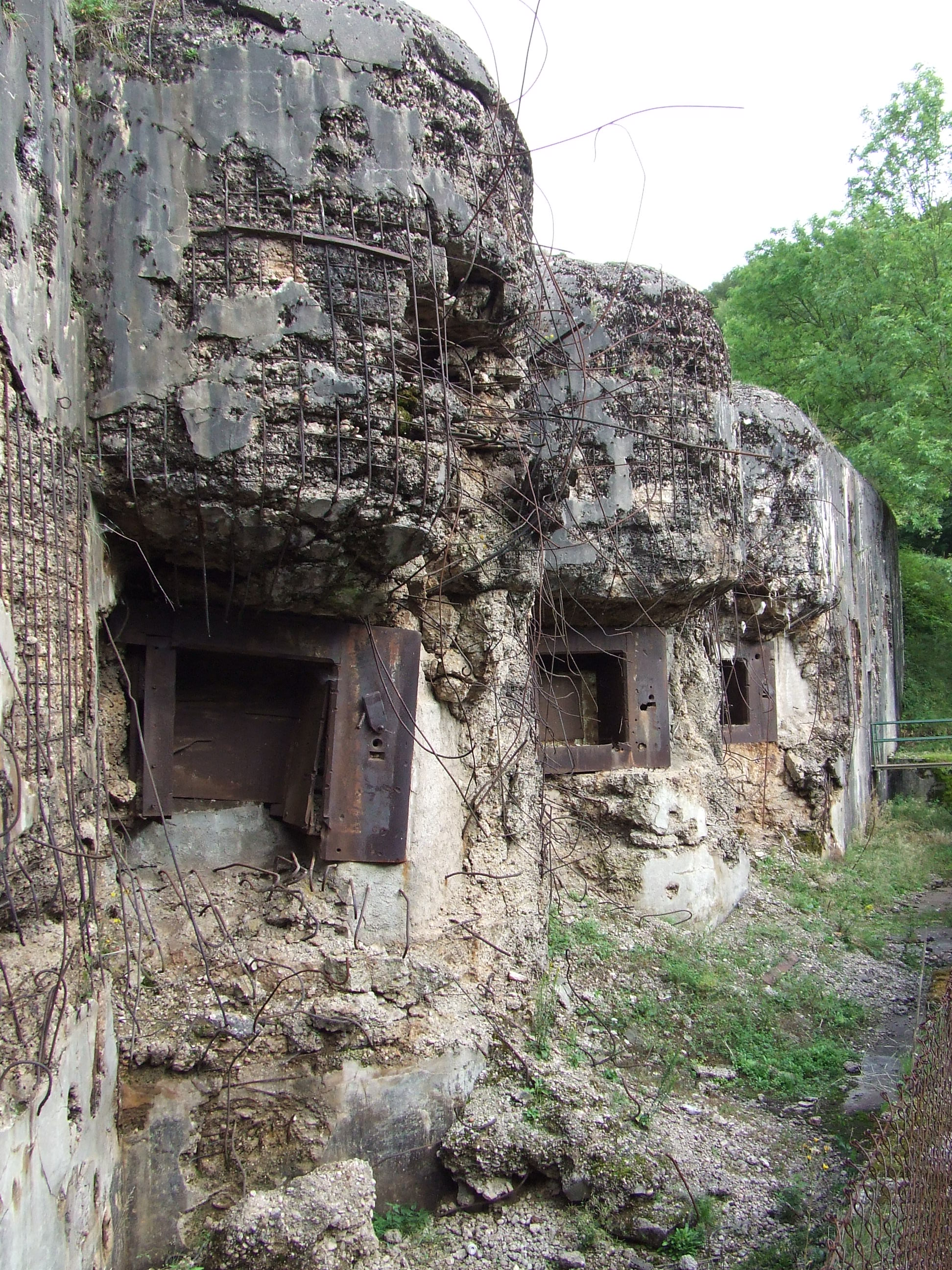
Hackenberg Block 8, showing damage from the 1944 American assault

== Concept and organization ==
The Boulay sector was part of the larger Fortified Region of Metz, a strongly defended area between the Ardennes to the west and the Sarre valley to the east. The Metz region was more important during the planning and construction phase of the Maginot Line than it was in the operational phase of the Line, when the sectors assumed prominence. The Fortified Region of Metz was dissolved as a military organization on 18 March 1940.

The Boulay sector was of two natures. The left, or western wing, was as strong as any place in the Line, with Hackenberg, one of the two largest Maginot ouvrages. The right, eastern wing received a lower priority and less funding. Many of the petit ouvrages that were built were to be augmented in the second cycle of construction that was to start in 1940, receiving remote entrances, underground barracks, or links between isolated positions in addition to additional combat blocks.

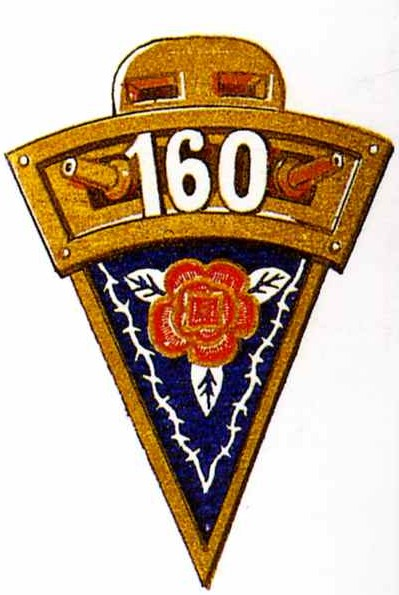
insignia of the 160th RIF.

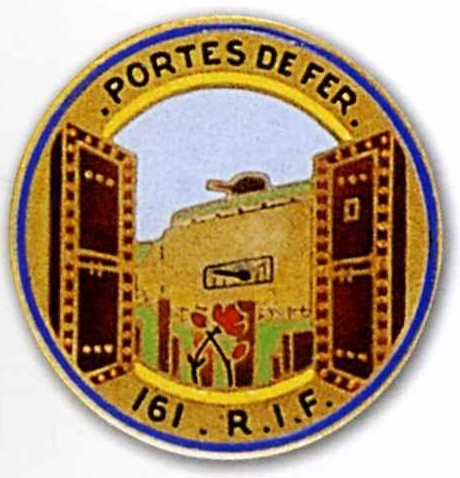
insignia of the 161st RIF.

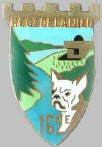
insignia of the 162nd RIF.

== Command ==
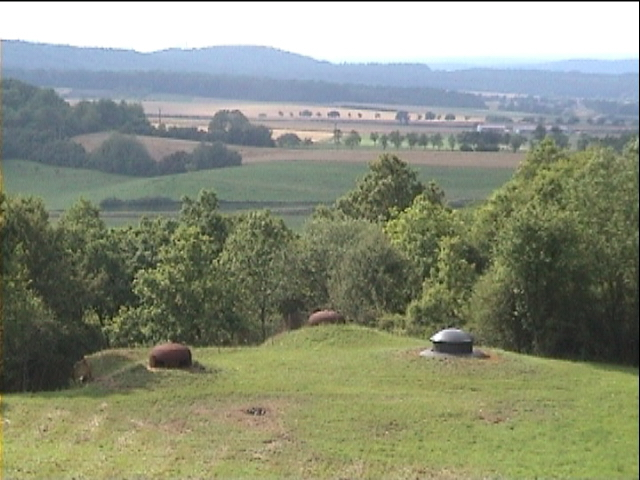
The top of Block 7, Hackenberg, showing two automatic rifle cloches and a retractable machine gun turret

The Boulay sector was under the overall command of the French 3rd Army, headquartered at Fort Jeanne d'Arc at Metz, under the command of General Charles Condé, which was in turn part of Army Group 2 under General André-Gaston Prételat. The SF Boulay was commanded by General Besse until late June 1940, then Colonel Cochinard. The command post moved several times. In May 1940 it was located at the Château Marivaux at Hayes. The interval troops, the army formations that were to provide the mobile defense for the sector, to support and be supported by the fixed defenses, were under the command of the 6th Corps (6e Corps d'Armee), General Loizeau, commander. The 6th Corps was in turn made up of the 42nd and 26th Infantry Divisions, as well as the British 51st (Highland) Infantry Division, a detached part of the British Expeditionary Force. Artillery support for the sector was provided by the 153rd Position Artillery Regiment (Régiment d'Artillerie de Position (RAP)), which controlled both fixed and mobile artillery, commanded by Chef d'Escadron Charly. The 42nd ID was made up of active-service troops, while the 26th ID was a Class A reserve formation.

At the midpoint of the Battle of France on 1 June 1940, the fortress troops of the SF Boulay amounted to three fortress infantry regiments in eight battalions, comprising 565 officers and 16,800 men. During the general retreat from the French frontier in mid-June the sector's mobile forces were designated the division de marche Besse These units were attached to the 6th Army Corps.

== Description ==
The sector includes, in order from west to east, the following major fortified positions, together with the most significant casemates and infantry shelters in each sub-sector: (Note: English-language sources use the French term ouvrage as the preferred term for the Maginot positions, in preference to "fort", a term usually reserved for older fortifications with passive defenses in the form of walls and ditches. The literal translation of ouvrage in the sense of a fortification in English is "work." A gros ouvrage is a large fortification with a significant artillery component, while a petit ouvrage is smaller, with lighter arms.) In addition to the unconstructed ouvrage at Hill 237, a similar position was proposed but not built at Hill 224/Guirlange.

=== Sub-sector of Hombourg-Budange ===
164th Fortress Infantry Regiment (164e Régiment d'Infanterie de Forteresse (RIF)), Lt. Colonel Priquet, followed by Commandant Orgebin in June 1940, command post at the Château de Hombourg-Budange

- Ouvrage Hackenberg, gros ouvrage A19 of nineteen combat blocks
- Ouvrage Coucou, petit ouvrage A20 of two combat blocks
- Ouvrage Mont des Welches, gros ouvrage A21 of seven combat blocks and two entry blocks
- Ouvrage Michelsberg, gros ouvrage A22 of six combat blocks and one entry block
- Ouvrage Hobling, petit ouvrage A23 of four combat blocks
- Casemate de Veckring Nord, C55
- Casemate de Veckring Sud, C56
- Abri de Veckring, X21
- Abri du Coucou, X22
- Observatiore des Chênes-Brûlés, O4
- Abri des Chênes-Brûlés, X23
- Abri de Klang, X24
- Abri du Mont-des-Welches, X25
- Casemate de Menskirch, C57
- Abri de Bilmette, X26
- Casemate de Huberbusch Nord, C58
- Casemate de Huberbusch Sud, C59
- Abri de Férange, X27
- Abri d'Ising, X28

Peacetime barracks and support:

- Casernement de Veckring
- Casernement de Férange (Ising)

=== Sub-sector of Burtoncourt ===
132nd Fortress Infantry Regiment (162e Régiment d'Infanterie de Forteresse (RIF)), Lt. Colonel Sohier, command post at Huhnerbusch in the Bois de Villers

- Ouvrage Bousse, petit ouvrage A24 of three combat blocks and an entry block
- Ouvrage Anzeling, gros ouvrage A25 of nine combat blocks and two entry blocks
- Ouvrage Berenbach, petit ouvrage A26 of three combat blocks
- Ouvrage de la Cote 237/Edling, petit ouvrage never built, replaced by Hobling
- Casemate d'Edling Nord, C60
- Casemate d'Edling Sud, C61
- Abri d'Hestroff, X29
- Observatiore d'Hestroff, O10
- Abri de Rotherberg, X30
- Abri de Bockange, X31
- Abri de Gornelange, X32
- Abri de Colming, X33

Peacetime barracks and support:

- Casernement de Bockange

=== Sub-sector of Tromborn ===
161st Fortress Infantry Regiment (161e Régiment d'Infanterie de Forteresse (RIF)), Lt. Colonel Viret, command post at Boulay

- Ouvrage Bovenberg, petit ouvrage A27 of six combat blocks
- Ouvrage Denting, petit ouvrage A28 of three combat blocks
- Ouvrage Village Coume, petit ouvrage A29 of three combat blocks
- Ouvrage Coume Annexe Nord, petit ouvrage A30 of one combat block
- Casemate d'Éblange, C62
- Casemate de Bovenberg, BCa2
- Casemate de Langhep Nord, C63
- Casemate de Langhep Sud, C64
- Casemate d'Ottonville, BCa1

X1 (Note: An abri is an infantry shelter, sometimes underground or under earth cover. An abri in the main Maginot Line often closely resembles a casemate, but is more lightly armed and can hold more occupants.)

Peacetime barracks and support:

- Casernement de Boulay

=== Sub-sector of Narbéfontaine ===
160th Fortress Infantry Regiment (160e Régiment d'Infanterie de Forteresse (RIF)), Lt. Colonel Bouet, command post at Gros-Bois, Narbéfontaine. The sector was transferred from the SF Faulquemont on 25 September 1939.

- Ouvrage Coume, petit ouvrage A31 of two combat blocks
- Ouvrage Coume Annexe Sud, petit ouvrage A32 of four combat blocks
- Ouvrage Mottenberg, petit ouvrage A33 of three combat blocks
- Casemate de Bisterberg Nord I, C65
- Casemate de Bisterberg Nord II, C66
- Casemate de Bisterberg Sud III, C67
- Casemate de Bisterberg Sud IV, C68
- Casemate Sud de Mottenberg, C69

Peacetime barracks and support:

- Casernement de Ban-Saint-Jean

== History ==
The construction of the left wing of the SF Boulay took place between 1929 and 1935. During the Phoney War, the sector was used for public relations visits by celebrities and heads of state. Hackenberg, for instance, was visited by King George VI on 9 December 1939.

=== Battle of France ===
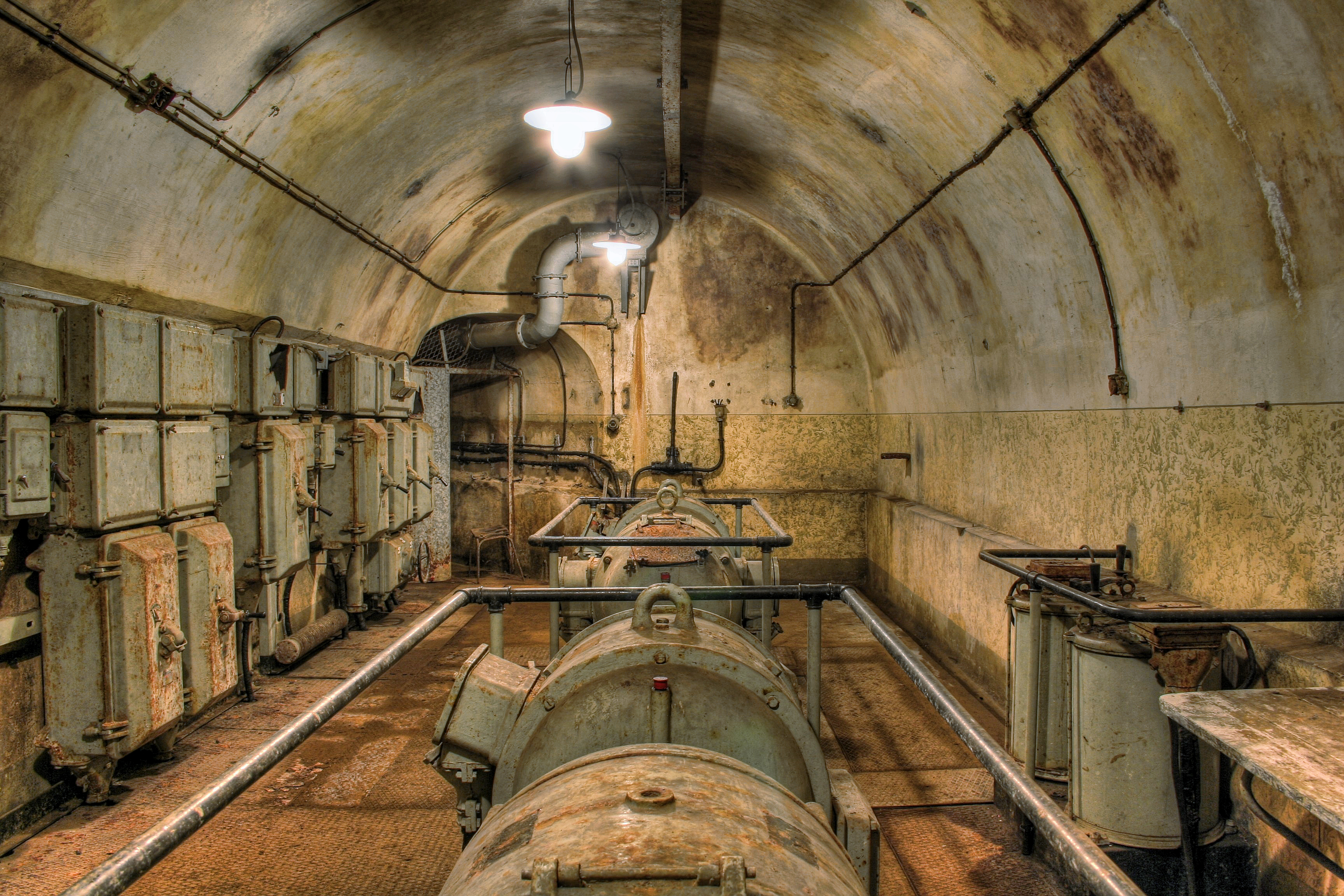
Electrical machinery room at Michelsberg

During the early part of the Battle of France in May, 1940, the SF Boulay was relatively quiet, with no serious engagement between French and German forces. However, by late May, the entire French army contemplated extreme measures to avoid being surrounded and defeated by the rapid German advance. In early June in the face of the German assault, and with the collapse of the left wing of the French armies in Flanders, all fortress units attached to the Third Army were ordered to prepare for withdrawal to the south and west between 14 and 17 June The interval personnel of the SF Boulay were to be consolidated into a division de marche entitled the DM Besse, consisting of the 160th, 161st, 162nd and 164th RIFs, together with the 153rd RAP and miscellaneous artillery units. On 13 June the troops of the field army in the intervals between fortifications began to withdraw towards the south, followed the next day by the fortress units designated for withdrawal. The withdrawal left the ouvrage garrisons in their positions to cover the withdrawal of the interval troops and the fortress infantry assigned to the divisions de marche. The DM Besse was assigned to the 6th Corps.

Amongst the units left behind to cover the retreat and to continue to man the fortifications, the garrisons had orders to sabotage their positions and to retreat in turn on the 17th. The garrisons in the Boulay and Falquemont sectors were ordered to prepare for withdrawal to avoid their isolation by German units operating behind the lines. As it became clear that retreat was impractical, the orders were countermanded. A poorly understood telephone call from Ouvrage Anzeling on the 15th caused the reservists manning Bousse to evacuate the position between 1600 and 2100 hours. Before departing they sabotaged their equipment, including their telephone switchboard, preventing them from receiving the counter-order to remain in place. After three days' march, the garrison was captured at Pange near Metz on the 18th.

Little attempt was made by the Germans to directly attack the central portion of the Maginot Line, the Germans preferring to go around the west end of the Line and take the Line from the rear. Hackenberg provided covering fire to other ouvrages in the area through June as the Germans advanced eastwards behind French lines. On 15 June the German 1st Army broke through the Line at the Saar and pushed west and east along the Line, enveloping the French armies in the northeast, meeting forces of the German 16th Army that had gone around the Line in the west in May.

From the night of 15 June there was heavy German patrol activity in the area. Positions in the Boulay sector received notice that they may be required to evacuate their positions, and began to sabotage equipment. The following day remained quiet, while the evacuation notice was reversed. German patrols increased on the 17th. Anzeling fired on German forces on the surface of ouvrage Bousse, causing some damage to the installation. During the night of 17–18 June, German troops appeared on the surface of Anzeling blocks 1 and 3 and to the rear of the ouvrage. The next day infiltrators were spotted between Anzeling and Berenbach. On 19–20 June Anzeling came under 105 mm and 155 mm artillery fire. Anzeling provided covering fire to Denting and Bovenberg. Anzeling provided covering fire for Mont des Welches. Intermittent firing continued on the 23rd from both sides.

Mont des Welches and Michelsberg suffered the only significant German assaults during the campaign. The German 95th Infantry Division under von Amim advanced on Michelsberg and Mont des Welches on 21 June, with advance patrols taking fire the same day. An assault using 8.8cm guns was mounted against Blocks 2 and 3, but was disrupted by fire from the entry block's cloches. Artillery fire from blocks 4 and 6 and fire from the personnel entry destroyed a German battery. Hackenberg joined to provide further support. Michelsberg repelled a full German attack on 22 June 1940, with help from Mont des Welches and Hackenberg. German artillery hit Block 3's cloches and the façade of Block 2. Block 6 destroyed a German battery with artillery fire. The German 8.8 cm guns were too far from their targets to be effective, and the gros ouvrages were able to give mutual fire support as intended. On the 22nd a German party came to Anzeling for a parley, asking for the surrender of the ouvrage, which was refused. Von Arnim's 8.8 cm guns were sent to other sectors, and he contented himself with waiting for further developments. Intermittent firing continued on the 23rd from both sides. The 24th was quiet, with supporting fire for Mont des Welches. As a result of the armistice of 25 June 1940, a cease-fire went into effect of 25 June. During the following days the minefields surrounding the ouvrages were removed and the French commanders negotiated terms for a surrender. On 3 July Anzeling surrendered to German forces.

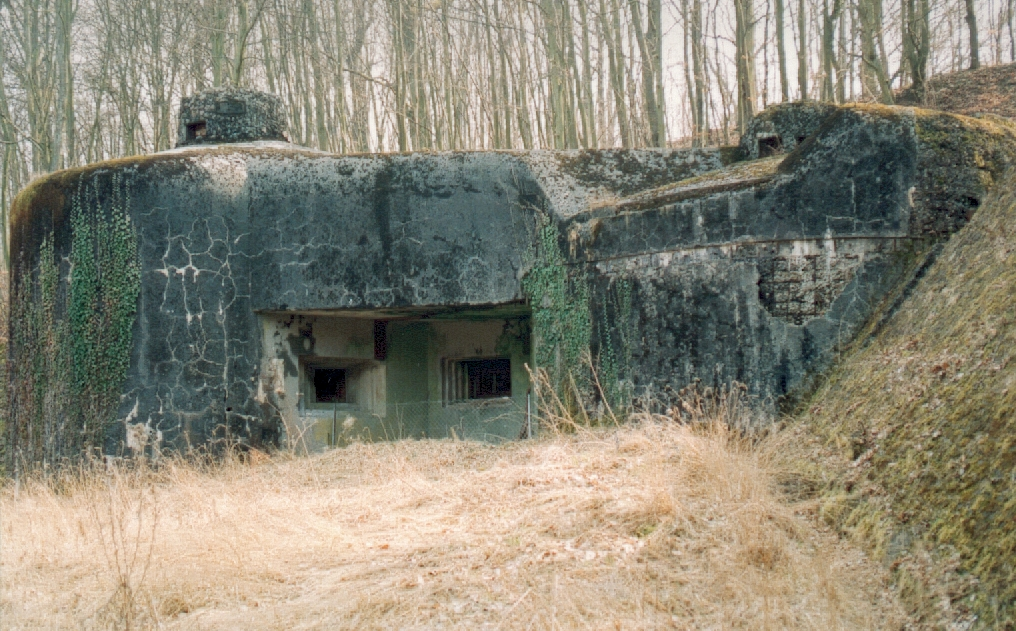
Hackenberg infantry casemate 22

Berenbach and the positions to its east played no significant role in either the Battle of France in 1940 or the Lorraine Campaign of 1944, although on 21 June Mottenberg fired in support of Ouvrage Kerfent, its neighbor in the SF Faulquemont. With the exception of the mistakenly-evacuated Bousse, all of the ouvrages remained under French control for a time after the armistice of 25 June 1940. Hackenberg's garrison evacuated on 4 July 1940.

In the following years under German occupation, Hackenberg, Anzeling and Michelsberg were used as bombproof factories. Mont des Welches was partially appropriated by the Reichspost, serving as a depot for post office equipment.

==== Units ====
The 160th Fortress Infantry Regiment held the Narbéfontaine sub-sector and its three petit ouvrages. The regiment's interval troops retreated beginning 13 June toward Metz and Nancy with the DM Besse, acting as a rear-guard. The regiment's first and second battalions were captured at the crossings of the Meurthe north of Nancy between 17 and 19 June. The third battalion was captured on 18 June near Laneuveville. The fortress garrisons that had stayed in place surrendered on 2 July.

The 161st Fortress Infantry Regiment controlled the Tromborn sub-sector, with four petit ouvrages. Its interval troops retreated toward Metz on 13 June, part of the DM Besse. The second battalion was captured at Saint-Nicolas-de-Port on the 19th, the first battalion the next day in the area of Meréville and Flagny. The regimental command was captured the 21st near Bois-du-Mont. The garrison units were attached to the groupement Cochinard and surrendered in place on 4 July.

The 162nd Fortress Infantry Regiment, or Nied Regiment, occupied the Burtoncourt sub-sector. From 13 June the regiment's interval troops were attached to the DM Besse.

The 164th Fortress Infantry Regiment was in charge of the Hombourg-Budange sub-sector, with three gros ouvrages including Hackenberg. From 13 June the 164th's interval battalions were attached to the division de marche Poissot. They retreated in the direction of Metz, becoming part of the DM Besse on 15 June. The first and second battalions were captured near Épinal on 20–21 June, while the third battalion was captured 21 June while defending the crossings of the Moselle at Vitrimont. The garrisons left behind were assigned to the Cochinard group, surrendering in place on 4 July. A remnant force under Captain Berthomieu retreated southwards and finally stood down at Avignon on 4 August.

=== Lorraine Campaign ===
During the Occupation, the Germans occupied Hackenberg and posed a considerable obstacle to American advances in 1944 during the Lorraine Campaign. Although much of Hackenberg's armament had been removed for use in the Atlantic Wall, some of the heavier guns remained. On 15 November, the U.S. 90th Infantry Division encountered Hackenberg as it advanced along the length of the Maginot Line. Block 8, with its battery of 75 mm guns, proved particularly troublesome, with 99 rounds falling on the American position in 90 seconds. After an attack using tank destroyers failed, the Americans used a 155 mm self-propelled gun against the rear of Block 8 in the morning of 16 November. The success of this attack allowed the Americans to take the west wing on the 17th. Hackenberg was entirely occupied by American forces on the 19th, only after the retreating Germans had destroyed the M1 magazine.

No other Boulay positions played a role in the Lorraine Campaign.

=== Môle de Boulay ===
Following World War II, the French military reclaimed the Maginot Line with the aim of renovating and improving it against a possible attack by Warsaw Pact forces through southern Germany. The strongest positions, Hackenberg, Mont des Welches, Michelsberg, and Anzeling were designated the môle de Boulay ("breakwater") in 1951 and were placed back into service after a period of rehabilitation. The petits ouvrages from Coucou to Denting were repaired and incorporated into the breakwater as well. After the establishment of the French nuclear strike force, the importance of the Line declined, and maintenance ceased in the 1970s, with most of the casemates and petit ouvrages sold to the public.

Mottenberg was in poor condition and was not chosen for renovation.

== Present status ==
Hackenberg, Michelsberg and Bousse are operated as museums and are open to the public. The remainder are either privately owned or are military property, abandoned and sealed.

In 1975, residents from nearby villages started to organize sightseeing tours, which led to the founding of a volunteer association for the preservation of Hackenberg. After being abandoned, Michelsberg was used between 1978 and 1988 for the cultivation of mushrooms. Since 1993 it has been protected by a charitable organization that allows visits. The Abri de Bilmette is also being restored by the Michelsberg volunteers. Ouvrage Bousse is under the care of a preservation society, the Association Fort aux Fresques, which organizes tours for the public. The association is named for the well-preserved frescos or wall paintings found within the ouvrage.

Coucou, Coume Annexe Nord and Denting are privately owned, Denting and Coume Annexe Nord are stated to be in relatively good condition.

Much of Mont des Welches' equipment has been removed for use in other Maginot museums. The lands remain military property. The entrances have been buried.

Most of the other ouvrages have been stripped for salvage. Hobling, Berenbach, Village Coume, and the above-ground portions of Mottenberg have all been salvaged.

The Abri du Sud-du-Bichel is being restored by the Association mémoire des intervalles de la Ligne Maginot.

In the 1980s Anzeling was used for the cultivation of mushrooms. Anzeling's M1 magazine is reportedly used as a shooting range by the gendarmerie and by local sports clubs. Some of its equipment has been removed for display in other Maginot ouvrages that are open to the public.

== Bibliography ==
- Allcorn, William. The Maginot Line 1928-45. Oxford: Osprey Publishing, 2003. ISBN 1-84176-646-1
- Degon, André; Zylberyng, Didier, La Ligne Maginot: Guide des Forts à Visiter, Editions Ouest-France, 2014. ISBN 978-2-7373-6080-0 (in French)
- Kaufmann, J.E. and Kaufmann, H.W. Fortress France: The Maginot Line and French Defenses in World War II, Stackpole Books, 2006. ISBN 0-275-98345-5
- Kaufmann, J.E., Kaufmann, H.W., Jancovič-Potočnik, A. and Lang, P. The Maginot Line: History and Guide, Pen and Sword, 2011. ISBN 978-1-84884-068-3
- Mary, Jean-Yves; Hohnadel, Alain; Sicard, Jacques. Hommes et Ouvrages de la Ligne Maginot, Tome 1. Paris, Histoire & Collections, 2001. ISBN 2-908182-88-2 (in French)
- Mary, Jean-Yves; Hohnadel, Alain; Sicard, Jacques. Hommes et Ouvrages de la Ligne Maginot, Tome 3. Paris, Histoire & Collections, 2003. ISBN 2-913903-88-6 (in French)
- Mary, Jean-Yves; Hohnadel, Alain; Sicard, Jacques. Hommes et Ouvrages de la Ligne Maginot, Tome 5. Paris, Histoire & Collections, 2009. ISBN 978-2-35250-127-5 (in French)
- Romanych, Marc; Rupp, Martin. Maginot Line 1940: Battles on the French Frontier. Oxford: Osprey Publishing, 2010. ISBN 1-84176-646-1
