= Ouvrage Denting =

Ouvrage of the Maginot Line

- Part of Maginot Line
- Northeast France

Site information
- Controlled by: France

Location
- Location within France
- Coordinates: 49.20222°N 6.54278°E

Site history
- In use: Abandoned
- Materials: Concrete, steel, deep excavation
- Battles/wars: Battle of France

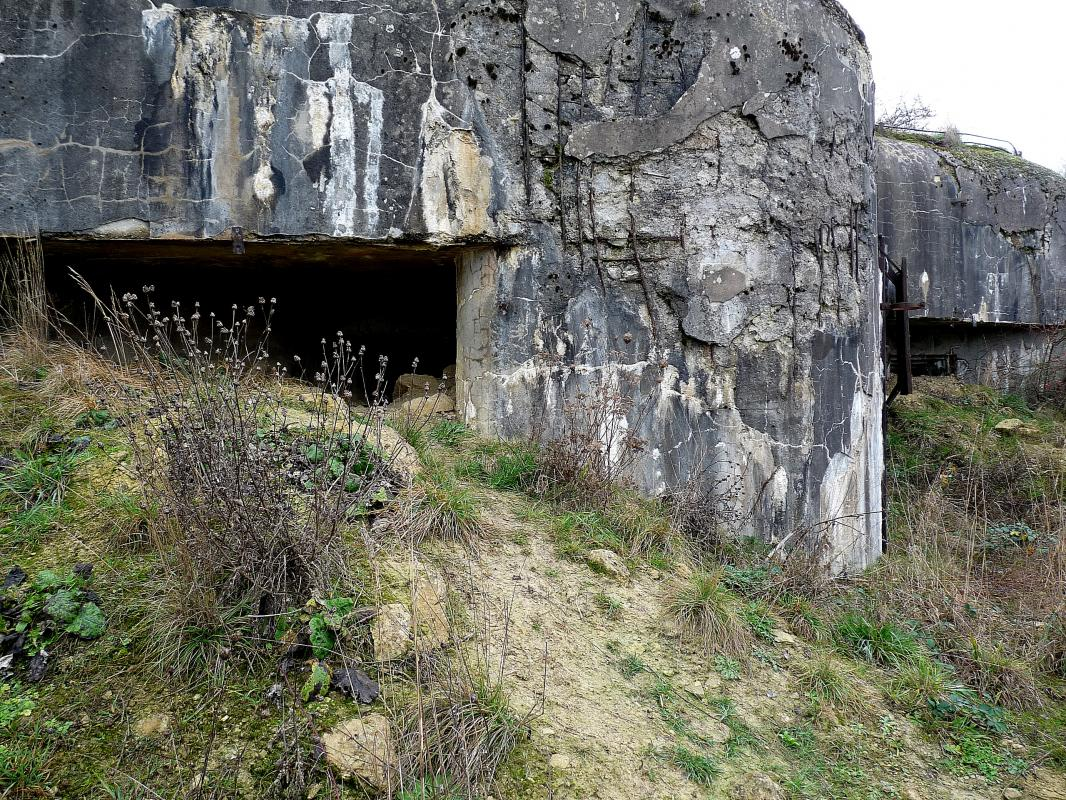
Denting A28 Ouvrage d’indanterie bloc 2

Ouvrage Denting is a lesser work (petit ouvrage) of the Maginot Line. Part of the Fortified Sector of Boulay, the ouvrage consists of three infantry blocks, and is located between petits ouvrages Bovenberg and Village Coume, near the village of Denting in Moselle département, facing Germany. The position saw little action in World War II.

== Design and construction ==
The site was surveyed by CORF (Commission d'Organisation des Régions Fortifiées), the Maginot Line's design and construction agency; Denting was approved for construction in May 1931. It was completed at a cost of 11 million francs by the contractor Duval-Weyrich of Nancy. The petit ouvrage (Note: English-language sources use the French term ouvrage as the preferred term for the Maginot positions, in preference to "fort", a term usually reserved for older fortifications with passive defenses in the form of walls and ditches. The literal translation of ouvrage in the sense of a fortification in English is "work." A gros ouvrage is a large fortification with a significant artillery component, while a petit ouvrage is smaller, with lighter arms.) was planned for construction in two phases. The second phase was to provide a separate entrance block a short distance to the rear. Heavy water infiltration required the provision of more extensive drainage work than originally planned.

== Description ==
Denting comprises three infantry blocks. The blocks are linked by deep underground galleries, which also provide space for barracks, utilities and ammunition storage. The galleries are excavated at an average depth of up to 30 metres (98 ft).

- Block 1: infantry block with one automatic rifle cloche (GFM), one twin machine gun cloche (JM), three automatic rifle embrasures, one twin machine gun embrasure and one machine gun/anti-tank gun embrasure (JM/AC47).
- Block 2: Infantry block with one GFM cloche, one twin machine gun embrasure and one JM/AC47 embrasure.
- Block 3: infantry/observation block with one GFM cloche and one twin machine gun turret.

=== Casemates and shelters ===
In addition to the combat blocks, a detached casemate is near Denting:

- Casemate d'artillerie d'Ottonville: Artillery casemate mounting two 75mm guns in casemates with a GFM cloche.

== Manning ==
The 1940 manning of the ouvrage under the command of Captain Coste comprised 127 men and 2 officers of the 161st Fortress Infantry Regiment. The units were under the umbrella of the 3rd Army, Army Group 2. The Casernement de Boulay provided peacetime above-ground barracks and support services to Denting and other positions in the area.

== History ==
See Fortified Sector of Boulay for a broader discussion of the Boulay sector of the Maginot Line.

Denting played no significant role in either the Battle of France in 1940 or the Lorraine Campaign of 1944. After the Second World War it became part of the Mòle de Boulay, a strongpoint in the northeastern defenses against Soviet attack. Denting remained under Army control until after 1971, when it was declassified and sold.

== Current condition ==
Denting is privately owned, and is in relatively good condition.

== See also ==
- List of all works on Maginot Line
- Siegfried Line
- Atlantic Wall
- Czechoslovak border fortifications

== Bibliography ==
- Allcorn, William. The Maginot Line 1928-45. Oxford: Osprey Publishing, 2003. ISBN 1-84176-646-1
- Kaufmann, J.E. and Kaufmann, H.W. Fortress France: The Maginot Line and French Defenses in World War II, Stackpole Books, 2006. ISBN 0-275-98345-5
- Kaufmann, J.E., Kaufmann, H.W., Jancovič-Potočnik, A. and Lang, P. The Maginot Line: History and Guide, Pen and Sword, 2011. ISBN 978-1-84884-068-3
- Mary, Jean-Yves; Hohnadel, Alain; Sicard, Jacques. Hommes et Ouvrages de la Ligne Maginot, Tome 1. Paris, Histoire & Collections, 2001. ISBN 2-908182-88-2 (in French)
- Mary, Jean-Yves; Hohnadel, Alain; Sicard, Jacques. Hommes et Ouvrages de la Ligne Maginot, Tome 2. Paris, Histoire & Collections, 2003. ISBN 2-908182-97-1 (in French)
- Mary, Jean-Yves; Hohnadel, Alain; Sicard, Jacques. Hommes et Ouvrages de la Ligne Maginot, Tome 3. Paris, Histoire & Collections, 2003. ISBN 2-913903-88-6 (in French)
- Mary, Jean-Yves; Hohnadel, Alain; Sicard, Jacques. Hommes et Ouvrages de la Ligne Maginot, Tome 5. Paris, Histoire & Collections, 2009. ISBN 978-2-35250-127-5 (in French)
