= Ouvrage Village Coume =

- Part of Maginot Line
- Northeast France

Site information
- Controlled by: France

Location
- Coordinates: 49.19833°N 6.56083°E

Site history
- In use: Abandoned
- Materials: Concrete, steel, deep excavation
- Battles/wars: Battle of France

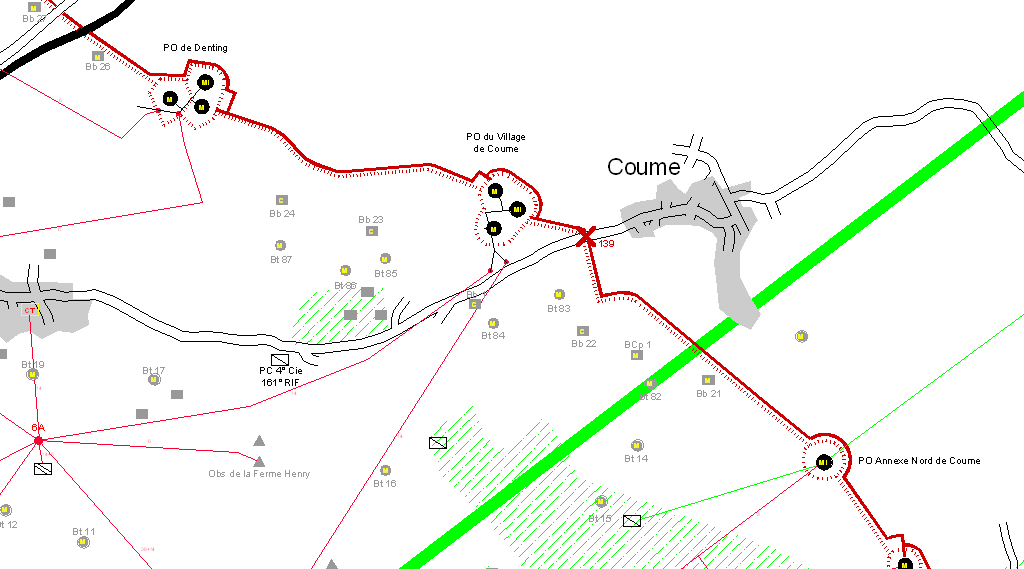
Location plan of the Coume village structure

Ouvrage Village Coume is a lesser work (petit ouvrage) of the Maginot Line. Located in the Fortified Sector of Boulay, the ouvrage consists of three infantry blocks, and is located between petits ouvrages Bovenberg and Coume Annexe Nord, facing Germany. The position saw little action in World War II. It was sold in the 1970s and stripped by salvagers.

== Design and construction ==
The site was surveyed by CORF (Commission d'Organisation des Régions Fortifiées), the Maginot Line's design and construction agency; Village Coume was approved for construction in May 1931. It was completed at a cost of 12 million francs by the contractor Duval-Weyrich of Nancy. The petit ouvrage (Note: English-language sources use the French term ouvrage as the preferred term for the Maginot positions, in preference to "fort", a term usually reserved for older fortifications with passive defenses in the form of walls and ditches. The literal translation of ouvrage in the sense of a fortification in English is "work." A gros ouvrage is a large fortification with a significant artillery component, while a petit ouvrage is smaller, with lighter arms.) was planned for construction in two phases. The second phase was to provide a separate entry block less than 100 metres (330 ft) behind the ouvrage.

== Description ==
Village Coume comprises three infantry blocks. A separate entrance block was planned for a second phase of construction which was never undertaken. The blocks are linked by deep underground galleries, which also provide space for barracks, utilities and ammunition storage. The galleries are excavated at an average depth of up to 30 metres (98 ft).

- Block 1: Entry/infantry block with two automatic rifle cloches (GFM), one twin machine gun cloche (JM) and one machine gun/anti-tank gun embrasure (JM/AC47).
- Block 2: Infantry block with two GFM cloche and two twin machine gun embrasures.
- Block 3: infantry/observation block with one GFM cloche and one twin machine gun turret.

== Manning ==
The 1940 manning of the ouvrage under the command of Lieutenant Lussus comprised 135 men and 2 officers of the 161st Fortress Infantry Regiment. The units were under the umbrella of the 3rd Army, Army Group 2. The Casernement de Ban Saint-Jean provided peacetime above-ground barracks and support services to Village Coume and other positions in the area.

== History ==
See Fortified Sector of Boulay for a broader discussion of the Boulay sector of the Maginot Line.

Village Coume played no significant role in either the Battle of France in 1940 or the Lorraine Campaign of 1944.

== Current condition ==
Village Coume has been stripped by salvagers and is largely buried.

== See also ==
- List of all works on Maginot Line
- Siegfried Line
- Atlantic Wall
- Czechoslovak border fortifications

== Bibliography ==
- Allcorn, William. The Maginot Line 1928-45. Oxford: Osprey Publishing, 2003. ISBN 1-84176-646-1
- Kaufmann, J.E. and Kaufmann, H.W. Fortress France: The Maginot Line and French Defenses in World War II, Stackpole Books, 2006. ISBN 0-275-98345-5
- Kaufmann, J.E., Kaufmann, H.W., Jancovič-Potočnik, A. and Lang, P. The Maginot Line: History and Guide, Pen and Sword, 2011. ISBN 978-1-84884-068-3
- Mary, Jean-Yves; Hohnadel, Alain; Sicard, Jacques. Hommes et Ouvrages de la Ligne Maginot, Tome 1. Paris, Histoire & Collections, 2001. ISBN 2-908182-88-2 (in French)
- Mary, Jean-Yves; Hohnadel, Alain; Sicard, Jacques. Hommes et Ouvrages de la Ligne Maginot, Tome 2. Paris, Histoire & Collections, 2003. ISBN 2-908182-97-1 (in French)
- Mary, Jean-Yves; Hohnadel, Alain; Sicard, Jacques. Hommes et Ouvrages de la Ligne Maginot, Tome 3. Paris, Histoire & Collections, 2003. ISBN 2-913903-88-6 (in French)
- Mary, Jean-Yves; Hohnadel, Alain; Sicard, Jacques. Hommes et Ouvrages de la Ligne Maginot, Tome 5. Paris, Histoire & Collections, 2009. ISBN 978-2-35250-127-5 (in French)
