= Fortified Region of Metz =

The Fortified Region of Metz comprised the central and most heavily fortified portion of the Maginot Line. The region was established in 1926 as a military organization for the French fortifications along the frontier with Luxembourg and Germany to the east of Longuyon in northeastern France, forming a shield to the north of the industrialized areas of Metz and Thionville. The region was dissolved as a military organization on 18 March 1940, its command personnel moving to the 42nd Army Corps.

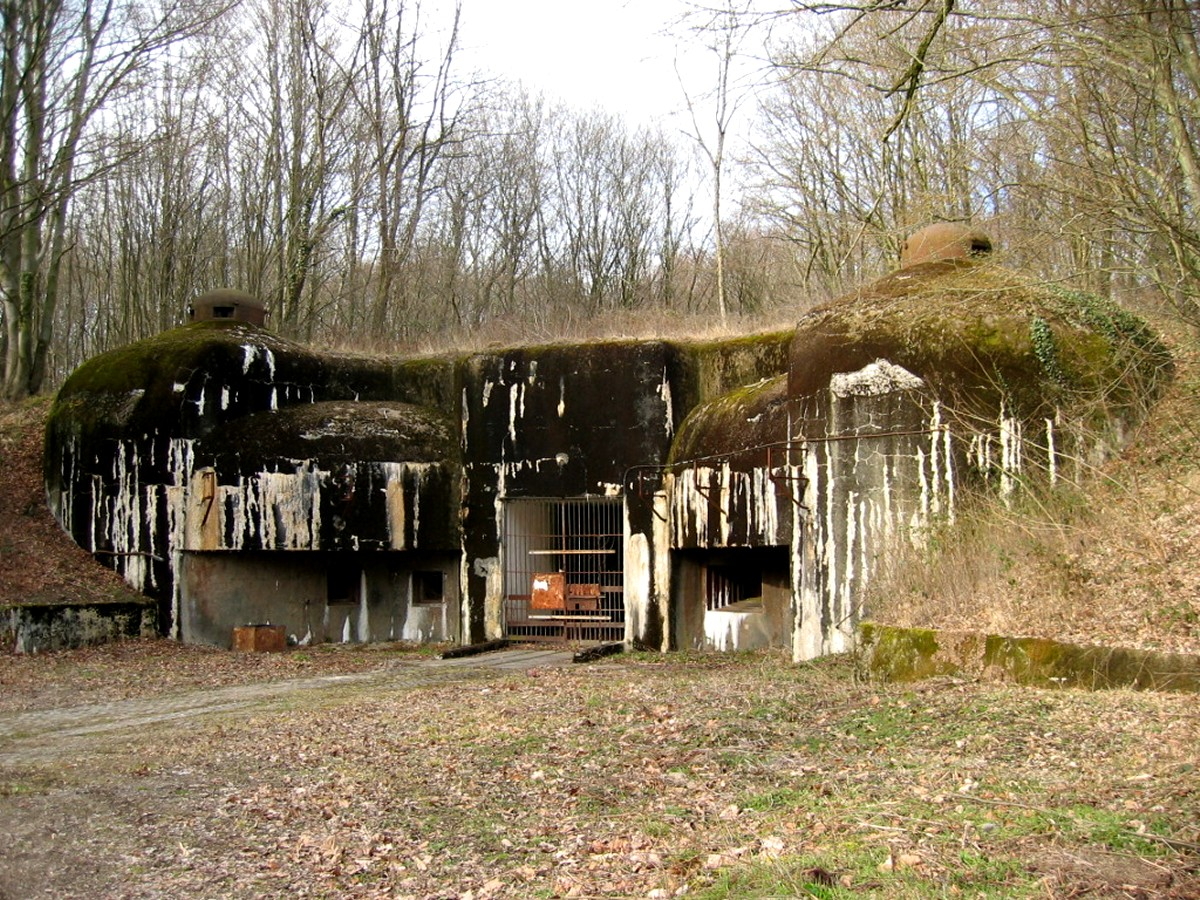
Munitions entry, Ouvrage Kobenbusch

The region was divided into four sectors:

- Fortified Sector of the Crusnes
- Fortified Sector of Thionville
- Fortified Sector of Boulay
- Fortified Sector of Faulquemont

The region was given the highest priority in funding, manning and equipment of all Maginot regions.

== Creation ==
Following the First World War, French defense policy was re-examined at the order of Marshal Philippe Pétain. The 1919 study recommended the creation of a mobile army that could carry war to the territory of an enemy, supported by frontier defenses that would prevent an enemy from penetrating French territory. The second part of the recommendation was to involve the creation of fortified regions (regions fortifiés) in which an enemy could be confronted. The initially recommended fortified regions included:

- The Rhine frontier, with two fortified regions, one to the south of Mulhouse and a northern region defending the Alsace plain to the frontier on the Lauter.
- An area to the west of the Rhine to prevent an incursion across the land frontier with Germany onto the Alsace plain.
- An area in Lorraine to defend the coal-mining regions in the Sarre basin.

The regions were to provide locations in which to confront an enemy and from which to launch an offensive to carry the battle onto enemy territory. The Metz region was considered a potential base for a counter-offensive should border defenses be pierced and Lorraine threatened, possibly using the former German fortifications of Metz and Strasbourg. The previous fortifications of the Séré de Rivières system of the 1880s were designed to defend the frontiers of France that existed following the Franco-Prussian War, in which France had lost Alsace and Lorraine. With the recovery of these territories following World War I, most of the Séré de Rivières forts were deep in the interior of northeastern France and not useful.

The Conseil Supérieure de la Guerre ('Supreme War Council') created a committee in March 1920 to study France's newly adjusted frontiers, with Marshal Joseph Joffre as chairman. Disagreement arose between supporters of Pétain, who favored continuous light defenses covering concentrations of troops and construction materials for field fortifications, and supporters of Marshal Joseph Joffre, who advocated fortified regions like the ring of forts around Verdun, that had performed well during the first world war. The committee dissolved without reaching any conclusions.

The RF Metz was again proposed in 1922 by the Territorial Defense Commission (commission de défense du territoire), which identified potential invasion routes from Germany into France at three locations: the Belfort Gap, between the Vosges Mountains and the Rhine, and across the Lorraine plateau, the last two directly affecting the Metz industrial basin, home of much of France's coal and steel industry. The CDT recommended that the industrial area of Metz-Thionville-Longwy be protected by new fortifications. The report noted that the frontier with Belgium would be difficult to fortify. The committee's final report proposed a continuous fortification from the Swiss border north to the Lauter, and west to Longwy, with the area of the Sarre, which faced the demilitarized area of the Saarland, left unfortified. The final report recommended three fortified regions:

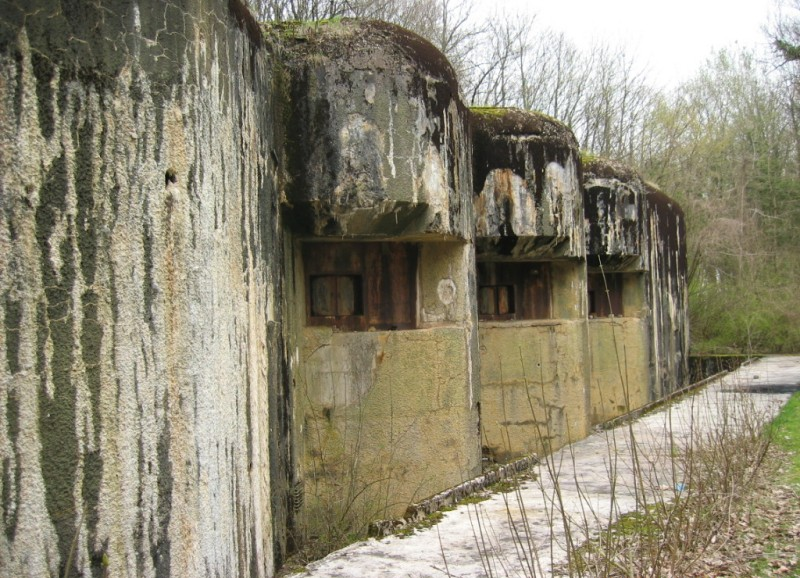
Block 6, Ouvrage Latiremont

- The Fortified Region of Metz-Thionville-Longwy
- The Fortified Region of the Lauter
- The Fortified region of Belfort

The CDT's report proposed that offensive operations into Germany should focus on an incursion to establish a line from Konz to Trier, then to Ottweiler, Homburg and Kaiserslautern. No specific recommendations on the location or character of the defenses were made. The Commission on Defense of the Frontiers (commission de défense des frontiers) was established on 31 December 1925 by Prime Minister Paul Painlevé, to once again consider the question of the frontiers. The commissioned was charged with formulating specific recommendations for defenses and for the incorporation of the existing defenses of Metz and Belfort. The report again listed potential invasion routes, listing the area to the northeast of Hunsrück in addition to the previously-identified routes. It reiterated the proposed fortified regions around Metz, Belfort and along the Lauter. The report formalized the concept of the fortified region, to be about 60 kilometres (37 mi) in depth, a distance dictated by the range of heavy artillery. The RF Metz-Thionville-Longwy was planned to provide a protected area from which to counter-attack an enemy moving into France along the Sarre, to protect the industrial regions, and to anchor the right flank of the northern armies. The German fortifications of Thionville and Metz were to be incorporated into the region, while the forts of Verdun, to the rear, were to be kept in reserve without renovation

The line of the fortifications was modified in 1927 to leave Longwy exposed, anchoring the right end of the region instead at Longuyon. This allowed optimal siting of fortifications on the heights behind Longwy, rather than contending with the town's basin and its close proximity to the border.

== Construction ==
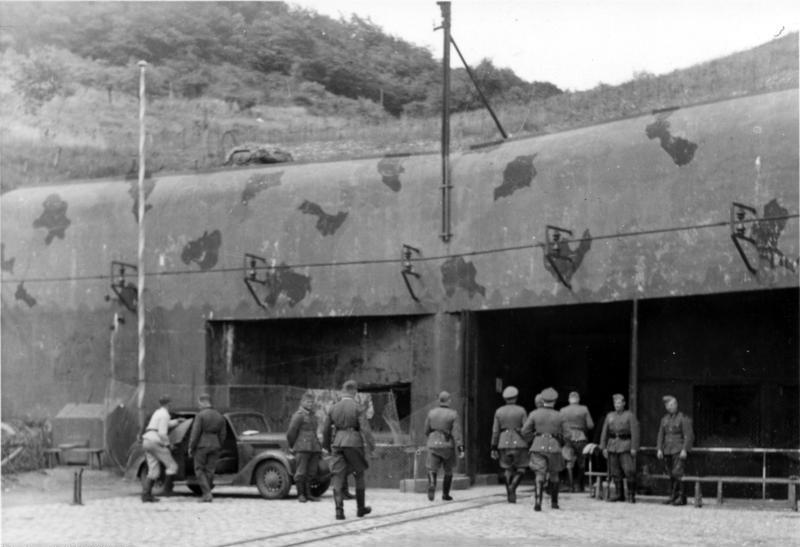
German officers entering the ammunition entry at Ouvrage Hackenberg

The Commission d'Organisation des Régions Fortifiés, or CORF, was established on 30 September 1927 to oversee the design, financing and construction of the Maginot Line. Its first priorities were the Metz and Lauter regions. CORF built 14 gros ouvrages (large artillery positions) and 24 petit ouvrages (more lightly armed infantry works), as well as more than one hundred casemates and infantry shelters in the RF Metz. In 1929 an initial appropriation of 1,498,000,000 francs was allotted to the RF Metz, the most expensive region in the Maginot system. The highest-priority positions in the RF Metz were ouvrages Rochonvillers and Hackenberg, with work beginning in 1929. A continuation of the construction campaign starting in 1930 resulted in the construction of three more large positions, six lesser artillery ouvrages, and seven infantry positions. Four interval casemates were built in 1930. At the same time, a program to provide the Line with long-range artillery was gradually dropped as costs mounted. By November 1930 the RF Metz had been allocated 2,298,000,000 francs.

From 1931 new projects were developed to extend the RF Metz to the west from Rochonvillers to Longuyon, and eastward to the Sarre. The left, or western wing was allocated an additional 400,000,000 francs. By the end of 1935, when CORF was disestablished, the sector's positions were being commissioned and garrisoned. However, budget cuts were felt in the eastern wing, where the expansion of several petit ouvrages was deferred to 1940, never started after war threatened.

== Operations ==
The Fortified Region of Metz was organized as the 6th Military Region in peacetime. On 2 September 1939 a general mobilization of French forces was declared. Reserves were called up and the Maginot Line was fully manned. The Phoney War continued into 1940.

The Fortified Region of Metz was disestablished on 18 March 1940, two months before the Battle of France, with Army command exercising a more direct control over the four sectors. At the time of its dissolution, the RF Metz was commanded by General Le Maignon de Kérengat from the Fort de Saint-Julien at Metz. After the dissolution of the fortified region, the staff was transferred to the 42nd Fortress Army Corps, formerly the SF Crusnes.

== See also ==
- Fortifications of Metz for the French and German fortifications of the late 19th and early 20th century around Metz and Thionville

== Bibliography ==
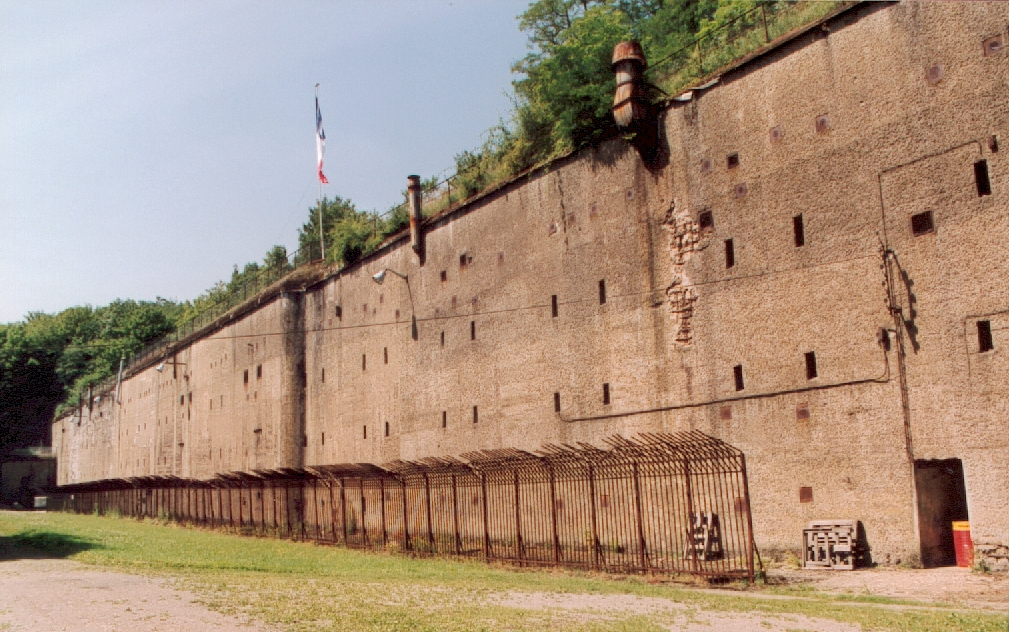
Fort de Guentrange, one of the German Moselstellung incorporated into the RF Metz

- Allcorn, William. The Maginot Line 1928-45. Oxford: Osprey Publishing, 2003. ISBN 1-84176-646-1
- Kaufmann, J.E. and Kaufmann, H.W. Fortress France: The Maginot Line and French Defenses in World War II, Stackpole Books, 2006. ISBN 0-275-98345-5
- Kaufmann, J.E., Kaufmann, H.W., Jancovič-Potočnik, A. and Lang, P. The Maginot Line: History and Guide, Pen and Sword, 2011. ISBN 978-1-84884-068-3
- Mary, Jean-Yves; Hohnadel, Alain; Sicard, Jacques. Hommes et Ouvrages de la Ligne Maginot, Tome 1. Paris, Histoire & Collections, 2001. ISBN 2-908182-88-2 (in French)
- Mary, Jean-Yves; Hohnadel, Alain; Sicard, Jacques. Hommes et Ouvrages de la Ligne Maginot, Tome 3. Paris, Histoire & Collections, 2003. ISBN 2-913903-88-6 (in French)
