= Ouvrage Hackenberg =

Gros ouvrage of the Maginot Line

- Part of Maginot Line
- Northeast France

Site information
- Controlled by: France
- Open to the public: Yes

Location
- Location within France
- Coordinates: 49.34139°N 6.36556°E

Site history
- Built by: CORF
- In use: Preserved
- Materials: Concrete, steel, deep excavation
- Battles/wars: Battle of France, Lorraine Campaign

Ouvrage Hackenberg, one of the largest (a gros ouvrage) of the Maginot Line fortifications, is part of the Fortified Sector of Boulay. It is situated twenty kilometres east of Thionville, in the Moselle département, near the village of Veckring, on the Hackenberg (343 metres). It is located between gros ouvrage Billig and petit ouvrage Coucou, facing Germany. The fort occupies the wooded Hackenberg ridge. Before World War II it was considered a showpiece of French fortification technology, and was visited by British King George VI.

In 1940 Hackenberg was never directly attacked, providing covering fire to neighboring positions and harassing nearby German forces. Its garrison was one of the last French units to surrender after the June 1940 armistice. In 1944, under German occupation, it was in action against American forces advancing along the Maginot Line. It resisted for three days before artillery bombardment from the rear forced the Germans to evacuate. Following World War II it became part of a strongpoint meant to delay a potential advance by Soviet forces into northeastern France. Hackenberg has been preserved and operates as a museum.

== Design and construction ==
The site was approved in stages by CORF (Commission d'Organisation des Régions Fortifiées), the Maginot Line's design and construction agency, between 1929 and 1932. Work by the contractor Enterprise de Travaille de Fortification began in 1929 at a cost of 172 million francs. A planned second phase was to add two 81 mm mortar turrets and three more casemates on the back side of the ridge.

Original plans called for a turret block with 155 mm guns and another with long-range 145 mm guns. More than 1,200 metres (3,900 ft) of underground galleries connect the entries to the farthest blocks 4 and 5, at an average depth of 30 metres (98 ft). An "M1" magazine, arranged with a horseshoe-shaped perimeter gallery connected by cross galleries between the legs, is located close to the ammunition entrance, while the large underground barracks and utility areas are just inside the personnel entry.

The ouvrage is Y-shaped in plan, with the main gallery splitting in two almost 1,000 metres (3,300 ft) in from the ammunition entry. A 500-metre (1,600 ft) gallery runs to the principal combat blocks of the west wing, while the other passage runs another approximately 1,000 metres (3,300 ft) to the combat blocks of the east wing. The gallery system was served by a narrow-gauge (60 cm) electrified railway that continued out the ammunition entry and connected to a regional military railway system for the movement of materiel along the front a few kilometres to the rear.

== Description ==
The gros ouvrage (Note: English-language sources use the French term ouvrage as the preferred term for the Maginot positions, in preference to "fort", a term usually reserved for older fortifications with passive defenses in the form of walls and ditches. The literal translation of ouvrage in the sense of a fortification in English is "work." A gros ouvrage is a large fortification with a significant artillery component, while a petit ouvrage is smaller, with lighter arms.) (large work) is composed of 17 combat blocks and 18 artillery pieces, with a total of 10 kilometres (6.2 mi) of galleries. The galleries are between 25 and 30 metres (82 and 98 ft) below the surface to protect against bombardment. The main gallery extends 1,884 metres (6,181 ft) .

=== Entries ===
- Ammunition Entry Type A: Connects to military railroad, defended by one machine gun/37 mm anti-tank gun embrasure (JM/AC37) and two automatic rifle cloches (GFM).
- Personnel Entry: defended by one machine gun/37 mm anti-tank gun embrasure (JM/AC37), one grenade-launcher cloche (LG), and two GFM cloches.

=== East wing blocks ===
- Block 1: infantry block, in front of the east wing, equipped only with a retractable machine gun turret.
- Block 2: artillery block armed with a retractable twin 75 mm gun turret and two automatic rifle cloches (GFM).
- Block 3: armed with one 81 mm mortar turret. An automatic rifle cloche (GFM) was tactically linked to the neighboring Ouvrage Mont des Welches as an observation point.
- Block 4: infantry block with one retractable machine gun turret, 37 mm anti-tank gun (JM/AC37) embrasure, one machine gun embrasure (JM) and two GFM cloches.
- Block 5: eastwards-flanking artillery block with three 75 mm gun embrasures, two automatic rifle embrasures (FM), two GFM cloches and one grenade-launcher cloche (LG).
- Block 6: artillery block with one 135 mm retractable gun turret and one GFM cloche.

=== West wing blocks ===
- Block 7 : infantry block, twin of Block 4 with one machine gun turret (JM), one machine gun/anti-tank gun embrasure (JM/AC37), one machine gun embrasure (JM) and two GFM cloches.
- Block 8 : westwards-flanking artillery block with three 75 mm gun embrasures and two GFM cloches.
- Block 9 : an unusual artillery block, armed with one 135 mm gun turret and a flanking 135 mm gun embrasure to the west. Two GFM cloches provided local defense.
- Block 10 : artillery block with one 81 mm mortar turret and two GFM cloches.

=== Observation blocks ===
Two observation blocks are situated on the ridge of the Hackenberg, which gives its name to the ouvrage

- Block 11: equipped with a periscope-type observation cloche (VDP) and a GFM cloche.
- Block 12: with a periscope-type observation cloche and two GFM cloches.

=== Tank obstacle blocks ===
Apart from Hochwald, Hackenberg is the only ouvrage in the Line with a deep anti-tank ditch and wall. The ditch is defended by Blocks 21 and 25.

- Block 21: located at the eastern extremity of the ditch, this infantry block is provided with one machine gun/anti-tank embrasure (JM/AC37), one machine gun embrasure (JM), one 50 mm mortar embrasure and one GFM cloche.
- Block 22: an infantry block in the angle of the ditch with one machine gun/anti-tank embrasure (JM/AC37), one machine gun cloche (JM), and a GFM cloche.
- Block 23: a small block armed with two GFM cloches and a grenade-launcher cloche (LG).
- Block 24: a large infantry block in the western angle of the ditch, with a machine gun/anti-tank gun embrasure (JM/AC37), a machine gun turret (JM), a 50 mm mortar turret and two GFM cloches.
- Block 25: a mixed block for the defense of the anti-tank ditch with a 75 mm gun embrasure, a machine gun embrasure, a 50 mm mortar embrasure and a GFM cloche.

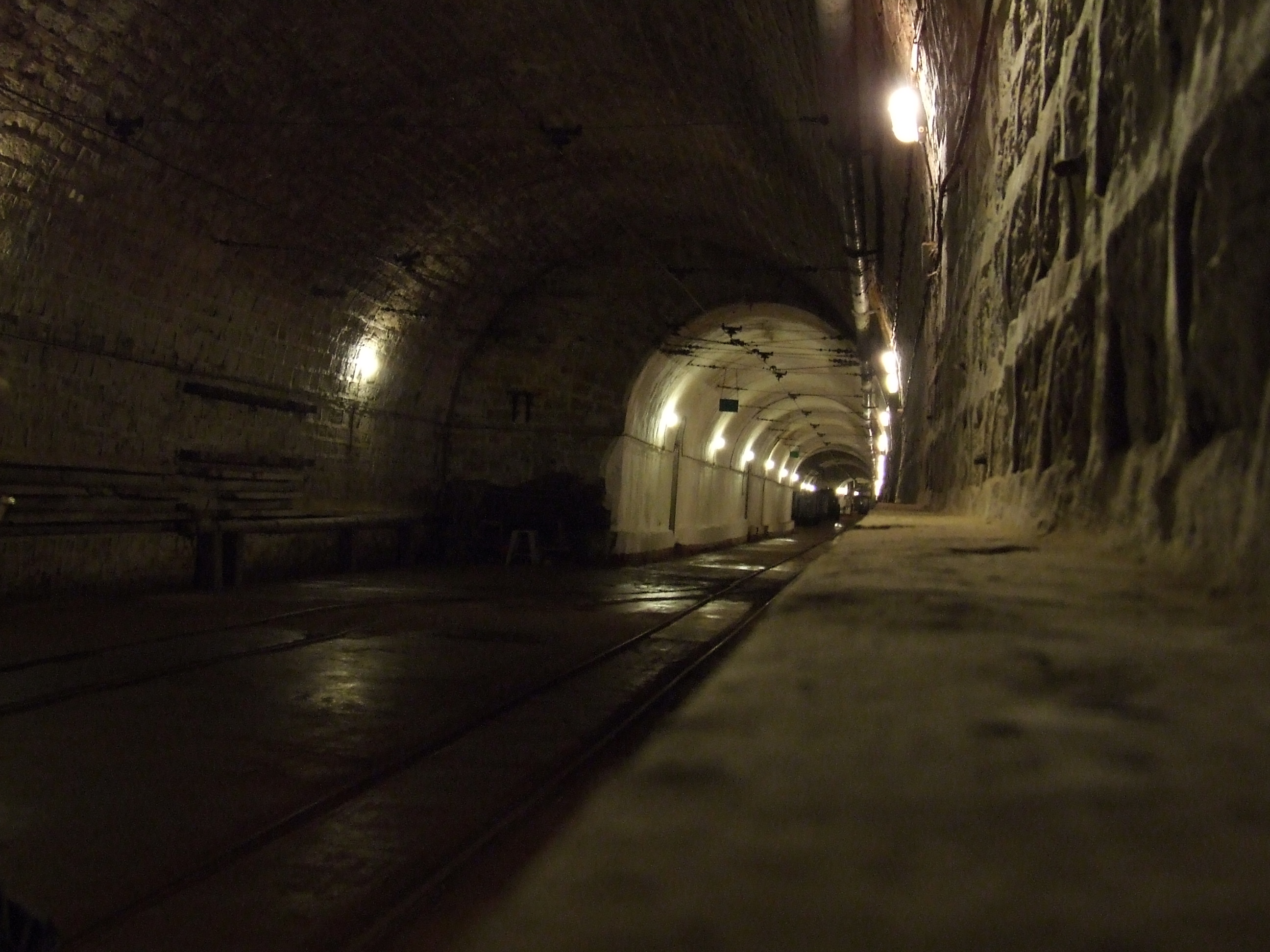
The rail switching area in the interior of the ouvrage, near the munitions entry. This area allowed munitions trains to exchange between diesel locomotives (outside) and electric locomotives (inside the fort).

=== Casemates and shelters ===
In addition to the extensive network of connected combat blocks, a series of detached casemates and infantry shelters surround Hackenberg, including

- Abri du Hummersberg: Subterranean infantry shelter (abri-caverne) (Note: An abri is an infantry shelter, sometimes underground or under earth cover. An abri in the main Maginot Line often closely resembles a casemate, but is more lightly armed and can hold more occupants.) with two GFM cloches.
- Casemate du Hummersberg Nord: Single block with one JM/AC37 embrasure, one JM embrasure and one GFM cloche.
- Casemate du Hummersberg Sud: Single block with one JM/AC37 embrasure, one JM embrasure and one GFM cloche.
- Casemate de Veckring Nord: Single block with one JM/AC37 embrasure, one JM embrasure and one GFM cloche.
- Casemate de Veckring Sud: Single block with one JM/AC37 embrasure, one JM embrasure and one GFM cloche.
- Abri de Veckring: Subterranean infantry shelter (abri-caverne) with two GFM cloches.

== Manning ==
940 men and 41 officers were billeted in June 1940, part of the 153rd Position Artillery Regiment (RAP) and the 164th Fortress Infantry Regiment (RIF). Official strength was 42 officers and 1040 men. The commanding officer was Chef d'Escadron Ebrard until 13 June 1940, succeeded by Chef de Bataillon Ismeur.

The Casernement de Veckring provided peacetime above-ground barracks and support services to Hackenberg and other positions in the area.

== History ==
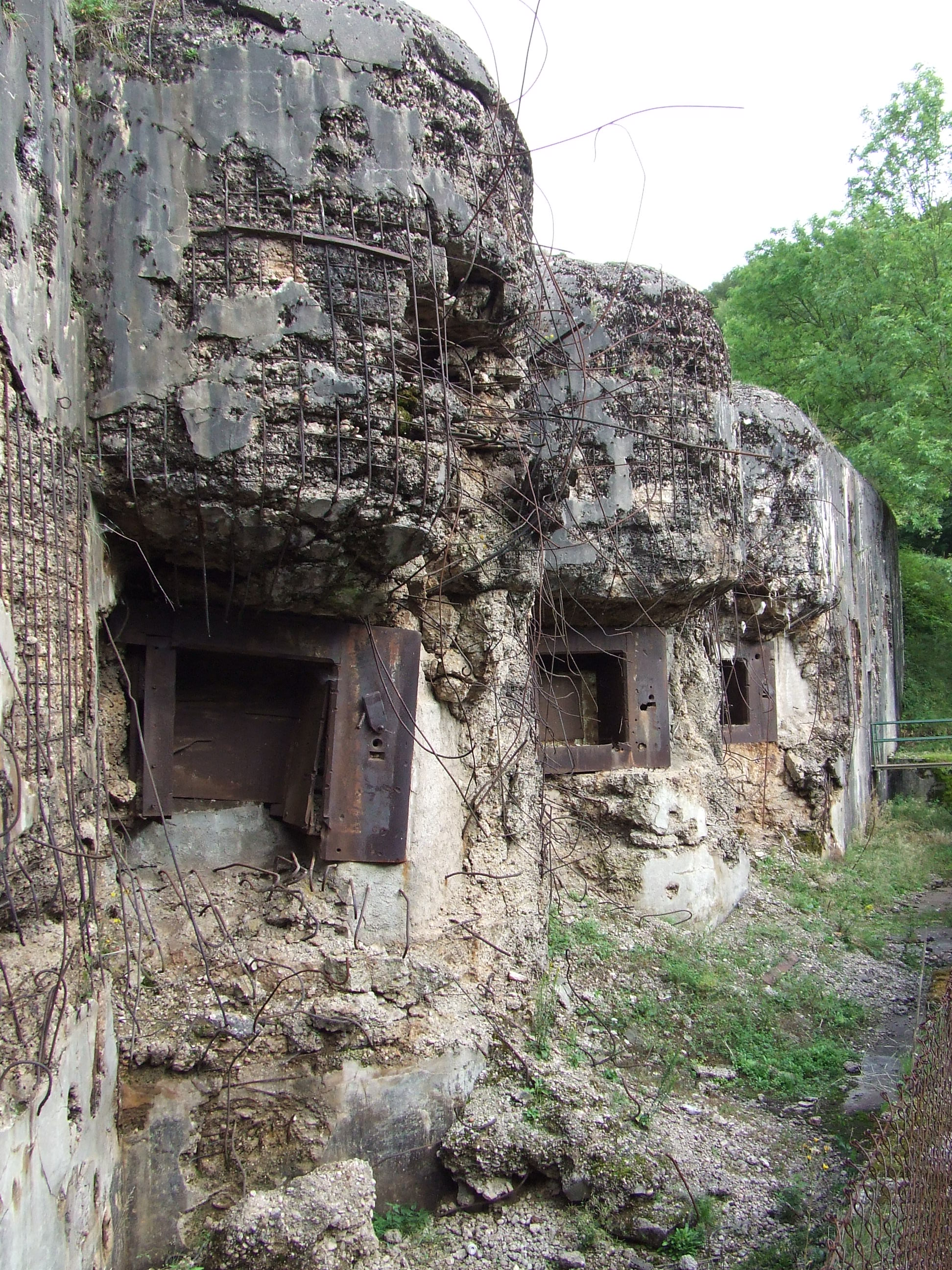
Hackenberg Block 8. The block posed a significant obstacle to the Americans in 1944.

See Fortified Sector of Boulay for a broader discussion of the Boulay sector of the Maginot Line.

The construction of Hackenberg' took place between 1929 and 1933. After France's entry into World War II, the ouvrage was considered emblematic of the entire Line and was visited by King George VI on 9 December 1939.

=== 1940 ===
German troops harassed Hackenberg in 1940. A portion of the front was at this time held by the British 51st (Highland) Infantry Division, along with the French 26th and 42nd Infantry Divisions. No attempt was made by the Germans to directly attack this central portion of the Maginot Line, the Germans preferring to go around the west end of the Line and take it from the rear. Hackenberg provided covering fire to other ouvrages in the area through June as the Germans advanced eastwards behind French lines. On 15 June the German 1st Army broke through the Line at the Saar and pushed west and east along the Line, enveloping the French armies.

The ouvrage remained under French control for a time after the armistice of 25 June 1940. Hackenberg's garrison evacuated on 4 July 1940. Following the takeover, French prisoners of war were put to work removing mines around the ouvrage, resulting in many French casualties. In the following years under German occupation, Hackenberg was used as a bombproof factory by the Klöckner-Humboldt-Deutz company of Cologne for the production of transmissions and gears. The operation used the M1 magazine and the caserne, sharing the magazine with German munitions.

=== 1944 ===
During the Occupation, the Germans occupied Hackenberg and posed a considerable obstacle to American advances in 1944 during the Lorraine Campaign. Although much of Hackenberg's armament had been removed for use in the Atlantic Wall, some of the heavier guns remained. On 15 November, the U.S. 90th Infantry Division encountered Hackenberg as it advanced along the length of the Maginot Line. Block 8, with its battery of 75 mm guns, proved particularly troublesome, with 99 rounds falling on the American position in 90 seconds. After an attack using tank destroyers failed, the Americans used a 155 mm self-propelled gun against the rear of Block 8 in the morning of 16 November. The success of this attack allowed the Americans to take the west wing on the 17th. Hackenberg was entirely occupied by American forces on the 19th, only after the retreating Germans had destroyed the M1 magazine.

=== Cold War ===
Following World War II, interest revived in the use of the Maginot Line to defend against a possible Soviet advance through southern Germany. Funds were allocated for restoration of the gros ouvrages, with new 105 mm artillery proposed for Block 8 at Hackenberg. Funding was not forthcoming, and work was limited to restoration of systems and improvements to existing armament. Restoration of Block 8, damaged in the American attack of 1944, was canceled. The renovations did not include the command post or the barracks.

By 1956, Hackenberg had been designated part of the Mòle de Boulay, a strongpoint in the northeastern defenses against Soviet attack. By the late 1950s interest in fixed fortifications was waning after France developed a nuclear deterrent. The money needed to maintain and upgrade the fortifications was diverted for the nuclear programs. Hackenberg was maintained for use by the Army until 1968, and finally abandoned in 1970 after it was placed in second-class reserve.

In 1975, residents from nearby villages started to organize sightseeing tours, which led to the founding of the volunteer-driven AMIFORT association for the preservation of Hackenberg.

== Current status ==
Today, site visits are organized by l'Association AMIFORT VECKRING. The volunteers have restored one block in the west wing to functionality, with a working elevator, a turret turntable and lift table. The movement of the turret is shown to visitors. One of the four generators is equipped with a post-World War II engine and is also running during sightseeing tours. The electric train in the mountain is used in the tour to transport visitors from the ammunition entry to the functional turret. Block 8 is also visited in the tour. The eastern wing is in poor condition due to subsidence in gypsum strata that have damaged the structure, and cannot be toured.

Guided tours are offered on weekends, opening hours on weekends are 14:00 to 17:00, varying over the year.

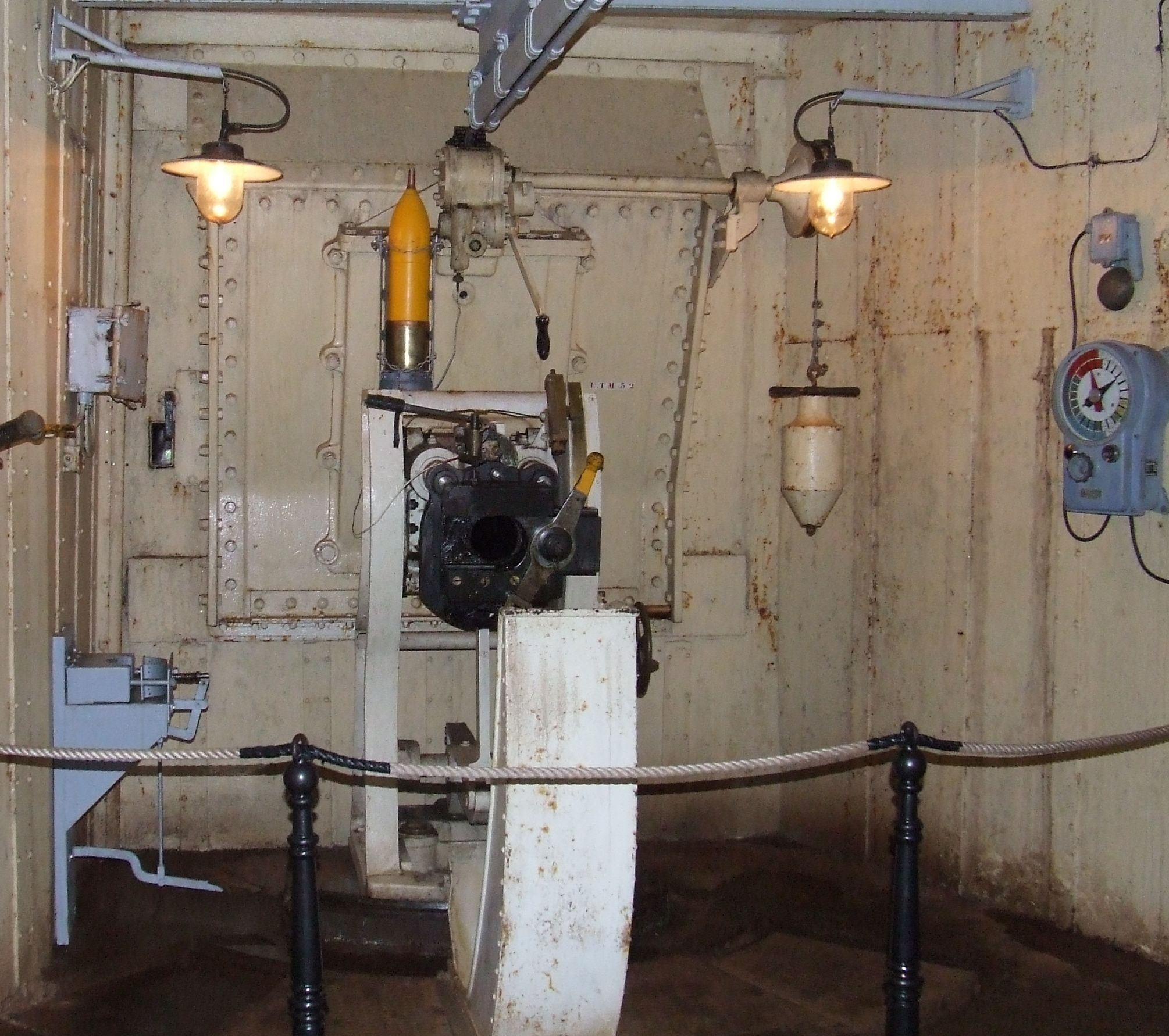
135 mm howitzer of Block 9, interior view.

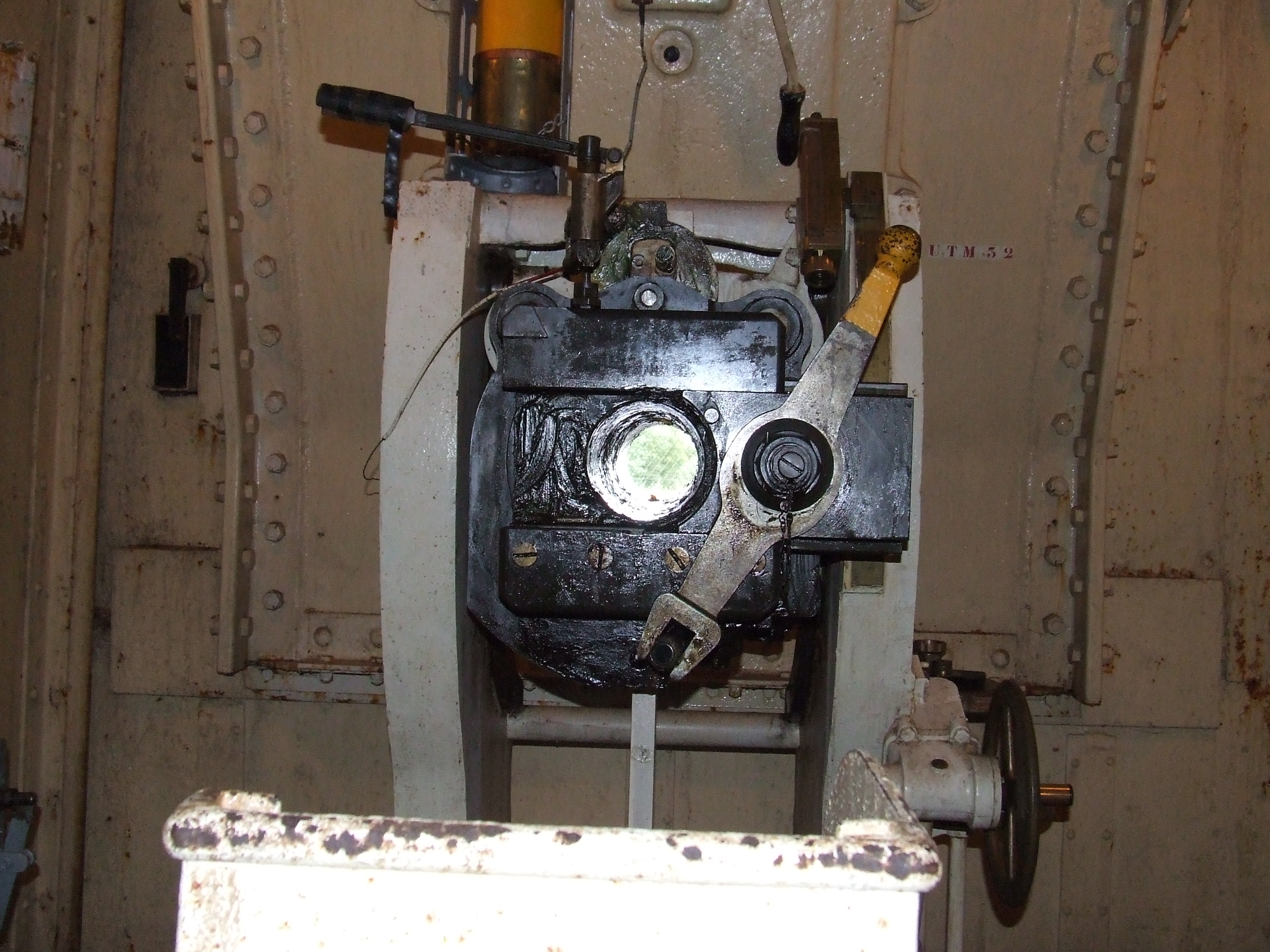
135 mm howitzer of Block 9, interior view, large area.

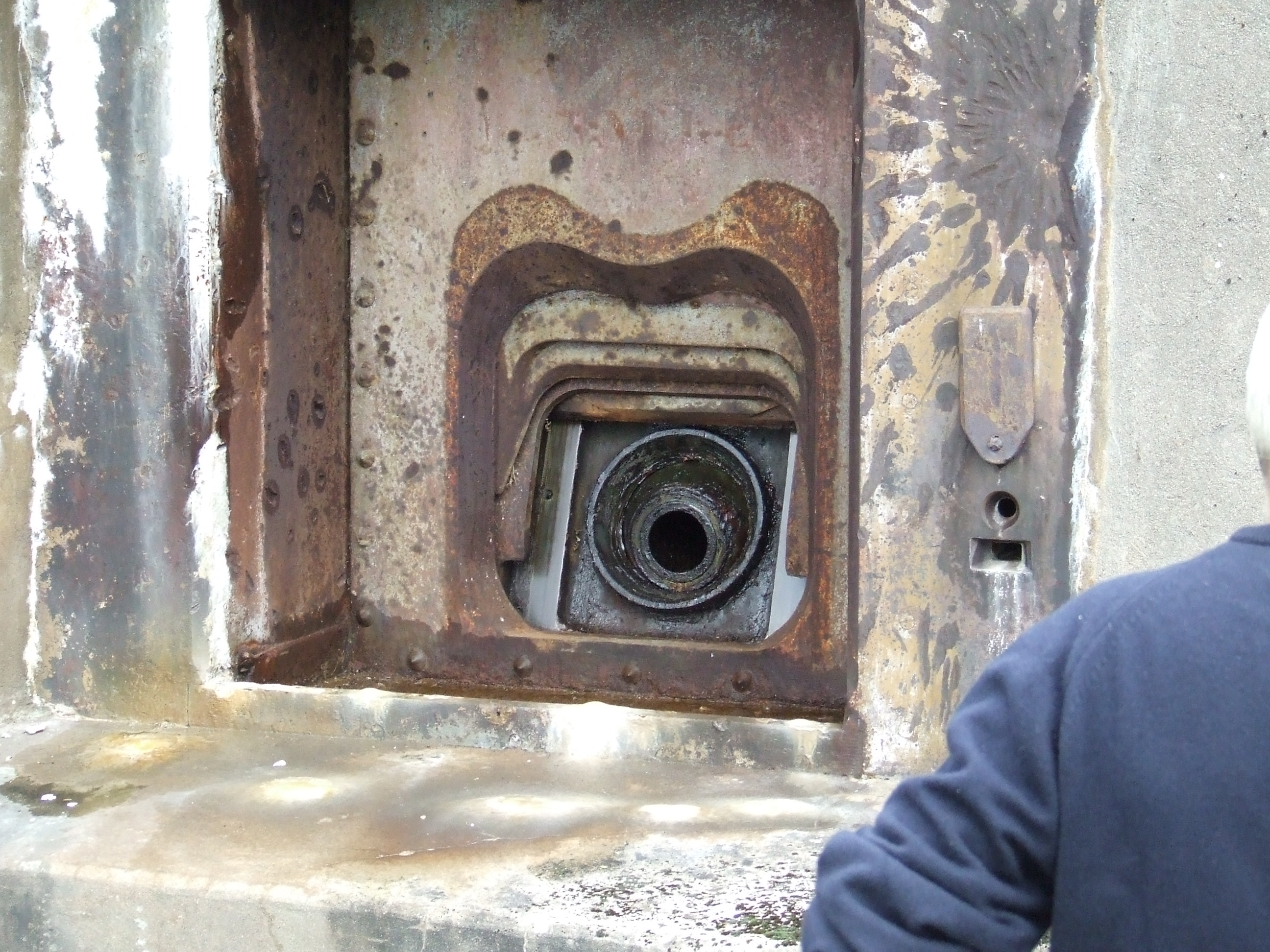
135 mm howitzer of Block 9, exterior view.

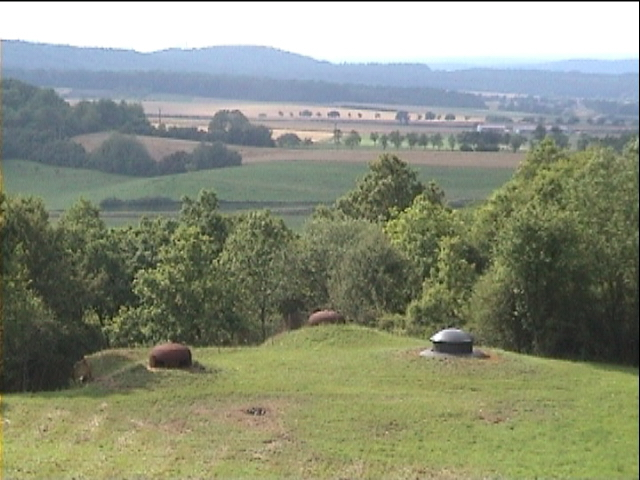
Hackenberg — top of Block 7.

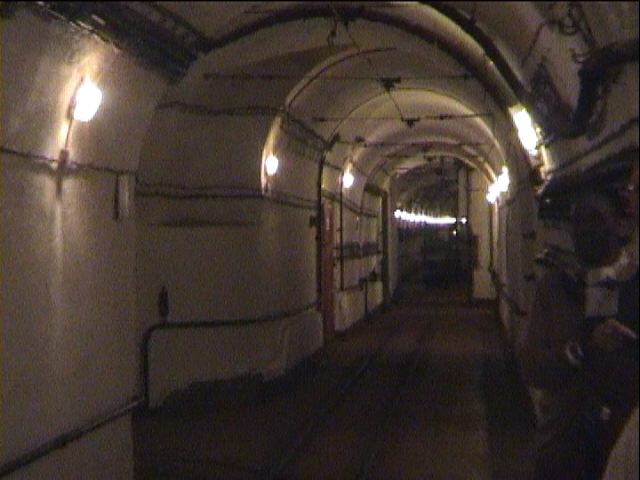
Hackenberg — Main gallery.

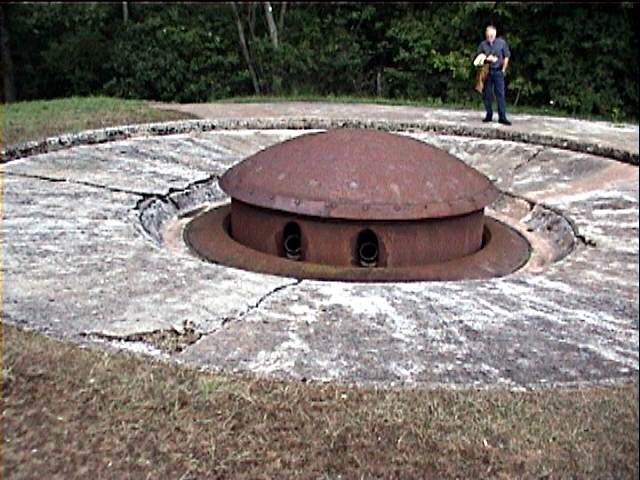
Hackenberg — Turret for twin 135mm bomb-launchers.

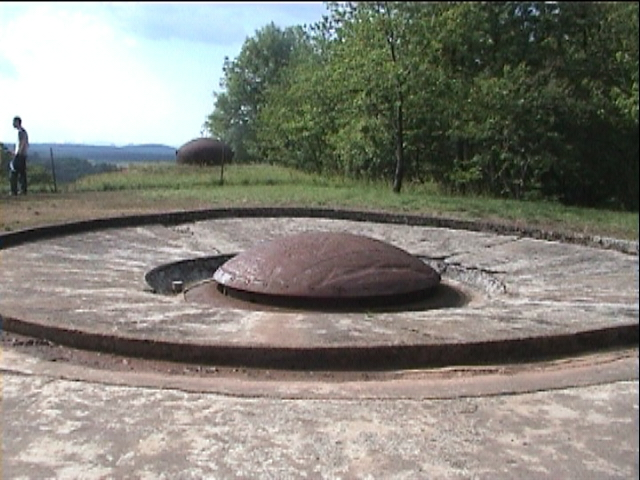
Hackenberg — The same turret closed or "eclipsed".

== See also ==
- List of all works on Maginot Line
- Siegfried Line
- Atlantic Wall
- Czechoslovak border fortifications

== Bibliography ==
- Allcorn, William. The Maginot Line 1928-45. Oxford: Osprey Publishing, 2003. ISBN 1-84176-646-1
- Degon, André; Zylberyng, Didier, La Ligne Maginot: Guide des Forts à Visiter, Editions Ouest-France, 2014. ISBN 978-2-7373-6080-0 (in French)
- Kaufmann, J.E. and Kaufmann, H.W. Fortress France: The Maginot Line and French Defenses in World War II, Stackpole Books, 2006. ISBN 0-275-98345-5
- Kaufmann, J.E., Kaufmann, H.W., Jancovič-Potočnik, A. and Lang, P. The Maginot Line: History and Guide, Pen and Sword, 2011. ISBN 978-1-84884-068-3
- Mary, Jean-Yves; Hohnadel, Alain; Sicard, Jacques. Hommes et Ouvrages de la Ligne Maginot, Tome 1. Paris, Histoire & Collections, 2001. ISBN 2-908182-88-2 (in French)
- Mary, Jean-Yves; Hohnadel, Alain; Sicard, Jacques. Hommes et Ouvrages de la Ligne Maginot, Tome 2. Paris, Histoire & Collections, 2003. ISBN 2-908182-97-1 (in French)
- Mary, Jean-Yves; Hohnadel, Alain; Sicard, Jacques. Hommes et Ouvrages de la Ligne Maginot, Tome 3. Paris, Histoire & Collections, 2003. ISBN 2-913903-88-6 (in French)
- Mary, Jean-Yves; Hohnadel, Alain; Sicard, Jacques. Hommes et Ouvrages de la Ligne Maginot, Tome 5. Paris, Histoire & Collections, 2009. ISBN 978-2-35250-127-5 (in French)
