= Ouvrage Bovenberg =

Lesser work (petit ouvrage) of the Maginot Line

- Part of Maginot Line
- Northeast France

Site information
- Controlled by: France

Location
- Coordinates: 49.22472°N 6.50444°E

Site history
- In use: Abandoned
- Materials: Concrete, steel, deep excavation
- Battles/wars: Battle of France

Ouvrage Bovenberg is a lesser work (petit ouvrage) of the Maginot Line. Located in the Fortified Sector of Boulay, the ouvrage is located between petits ouvrages Berenbach and Denting, facing Germany. It consists of two infantry blocks and two artillery blocks.

== Design and construction ==
The site was surveyed by CORF (Commission d'Organisation des Régions Fortifiées), the Maginot Line's design and construction agency; Bovenberg was approved for construction in early 1931. It was completed at a cost of 26 million francs by the contractor Omnium of Paris. The petit ouvrage (Note: English-language sources use the French term ouvrage as the preferred term for the Maginot positions, in preference to "fort", a term usually reserved for older fortifications with passive defensives in the form of walls and ditches. The literal translation of ouvrage in the sense of a fortification in English is "work." A gros ouvrage is a large fortification with a significant artillery component, while a petit ouvrage is smaller, with lighter arms.) was planned for construction in two phases, the original second phase designed to expand the position into a gros ouvrage with artillery. A scaled-down second phase was contemplated in 1939. No version of the second phase was ever carried out.

== Description ==
Bovenberg comprises six infantry blocks. Block 3 is not connected to the main ouvrage. A connection was planned for Phase 2, which also envisioned an entry several hundred meters to the rear, but was not pursued in time for the war. The blocks are linked by deep underground galleries, which also provide space for barracks, utilities and ammunition storage. The galleries are excavated at an average depth of up to 30 metres (98 ft).

- Block 1: infantry/entry block with two automatic rifle cloches (GFM), three automatic rifle embrasures, one twin machine gun embrasure and one machine gun/anti-tank gun embrasure (JM/AC47).
- Block 2: Infantry block with two GFM cloches and one grenade launcher cloche (LG).
- Block 3: Infantry block with two GFM cloches, one twin machine gun cloche (JM), four automatic rifle embrasures, two twin machine gun embrasures and two JM/AC47 embrasures. Built essentially as a double casemate block, it is not linked by underground galleries to the rest of the ouvrage and has its own power source, two 8 hp (6.0 kW) CLM generators.
- Block 4: Infantry block with one GFM cloche and two JM cloches. Nearby are a false machine gun cloche and a mock machine gun turret.
- Block 5: Infantry block with one GFM cloche and two JM cloches. Nearby are a false machine gun cloche and a mock machine gun turret.
- Block 6: Infantry block with one GFM cloche and one retractablemachine gun turret.

=== Casemates and shelters ===
In addition to the combat blocks, a series of detached casemates and infantry shelters surround Bovenberg, including

- Casemate d'artillerie de Bovenberg: Artillery casemate close to the ouvrage but not connected by underground gallery, mounting two 75mm guns in casemates with a GFM cloche.
- Casemate de Langhep Nord: Single casemate with one JM/AC47 embrasure, one JM embrasure and one GFM cloche.
- Casemate de Langhep Sud: Single casemate with one JM/AC47 embrasure, one JM embrasure and two GFM cloches.

== Manning ==
The 1940 manning of the ouvrage under the command of Lieutenant Lambret comprised 228 men and 7 officers of the 161st Fortress Infantry Regiment. The units were under the umbrella of the 3rd Army, Army Group 2. The Casernement de Boulay provided peacetime above-ground barracks and support services to Berenbach and other positions in the area.

== History ==
See Fortified Sector of Boulay for a broader discussion of the Boulay sector of the Maginot Line.

Bovenberg played no significant role in either the Battle of France in 1940 or the Lorraine Campaign of 1944. After the Second World War it became part of the Mòle de Boulay, a strongpoint in the northeastern defenses against Soviet attack. Bovenberg remained under Army control until after 1971, when it was declassified and sold.

== See also ==
- List of all works on Maginot Line
- Siegfried Line
- Atlantic Wall
- Czechoslovak border fortifications

== Bibliography ==
- Allcorn, William. The Maginot Line 1928-45. Oxford: Osprey Publishing, 2003. ISBN 1-84176-646-1
- Kaufmann, J.E. and Kaufmann, H.W. Fortress France: The Maginot Line and French Defenses in World War II, Stackpole Books, 2006. ISBN 0-275-98345-5
- Kaufmann, J.E., Kaufmann, H.W., Jancovič-Potočnik, A. and Lang, P. The Maginot Line: History and Guide, Pen and Sword, 2011. ISBN 978-1-84884-068-3
- Mary, Jean-Yves; Hohnadel, Alain; Sicard, Jacques. Hommes et Ouvrages de la Ligne Maginot, Tome 1. Paris, Histoire & Collections, 2001. ISBN 2-908182-88-2 (in French)
- Mary, Jean-Yves; Hohnadel, Alain; Sicard, Jacques. Hommes et Ouvrages de la Ligne Maginot, Tome 2. Paris, Histoire & Collections, 2003. ISBN 2-908182-97-1 (in French)
- Mary, Jean-Yves; Hohnadel, Alain; Sicard, Jacques. Hommes et Ouvrages de la Ligne Maginot, Tome 3. Paris, Histoire & Collections, 2003. ISBN 2-913903-88-6 (in French)
- Mary, Jean-Yves; Hohnadel, Alain; Sicard, Jacques. Hommes et Ouvrages de la Ligne Maginot, Tome 5. Paris, Histoire & Collections, 2009. ISBN 978-2-35250-127-5 (in French)
