= Ouvrage Mont des Welches =

Gros ouvrage of the Maginot Line

- Part of Maginot Line
- Northeast France
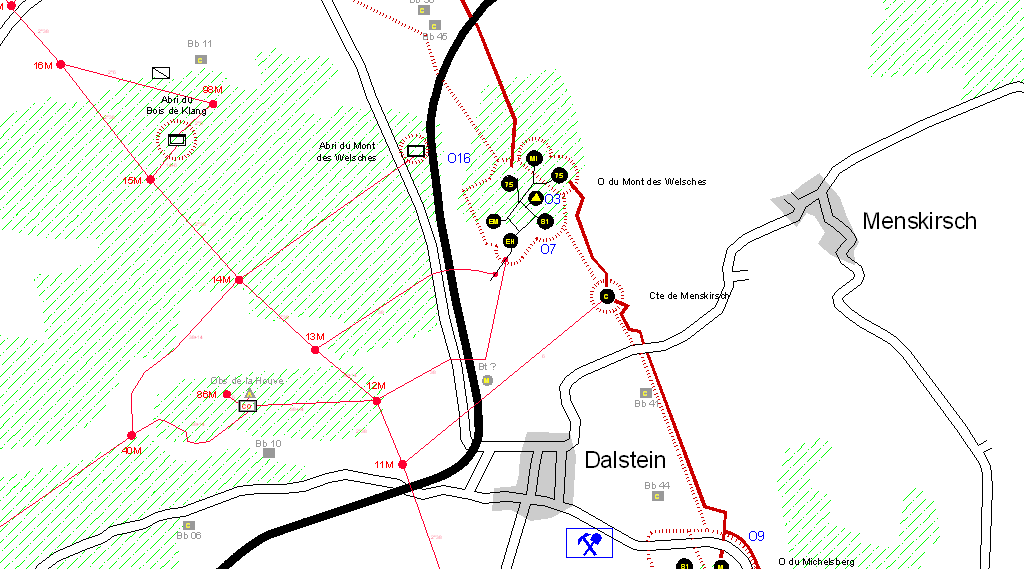
- Plan de situation de l'ouvrage du Mont des Welches

Site information
- Controlled by: France

Location
- Coordinates: 49.31806°N 6.40847°E

Site history
- In use: Abandoned
- Materials: Concrete, steel, deep excavation
- Battles/wars: Battle of France, Lorraine Campaign

Ouvrage Mont des Welches, a gros ouvrage of the Maginot Line fortifications, is part of the Fortified Sector of Boulay. It comprises two entrance blocks, one infantry block, one artillery block, one observation block and two combination blocks. It is located between petit ouvrage Coucou and gros ouvrage Michelsberg, facing Germany. Relatively small for a gros ouvrage, Mont des Welches saw a brief period of sharp action in June 1940, when German forces moving along the rear of the Maginot Line engaged the position without success. After modest renovations in the 1950s, Mont des Welches was abandoned in the 1970s.

== Design and construction ==
Mont des Welches was approved for construction by CORF (Commission d'Organisation des Régions Fortifiées), the Maginot Line's design and construction agency, in June 1930 and became operational by 1935, at a cost of 49 million francs. The contractor was Gianotti of Nice.

== Description ==
The comparatively small gros ouvrage (Note: English-language sources use the French term ouvrage as the preferred term for the Maginot positions, in preference to "fort", a term usually reserved for older fortifications with passive defenses in the form of walls and ditches. The literal translation of ouvrage in the sense of a fortification in English is "work." A gros ouvrage is a large fortification with a significant artillery component, while a petit ouvrage is smaller, with lighter arms.) comprises two entrance blocks, one infantry block, one artillery block, one observation block, and two combination blocks. It lacks a central "M1" ammunition magazine, and unlike most gros ouvrages, its 60 cm internal rail network was not electrified, relying on human power to move the rail cars. The underground gallery system is compact, about 200 metres (660 ft) from end to end, and unlike larger ouvrages where the gallery system is linear in concept, the central portion of Mont des Welches is a dense network of cross galleries between to main galleries, housing the barracks and utility areas. The galleries are excavated at an average depth of up to 30 metres (98 ft).

- Block 1:Artillery block with one retractable twin 81mm mortar turret and two automatic rifle cloches (GFM).
- Block 2: Infantry block with one retractable twin 75mm gun turret, one twin machine gun embrasure, one JM/AC37 twin machine gun/anti-tank gun embrasure, and two GFM cloches.
- Block 3: Infantry block with one retractable machine gun turret.
- Block 4: Artillery block with one retractable twin 75mm gun turret, one twin machine gun embrasure (JM), one JM/AC37 embrasure, two 81mm mortar embrasures and two GFM cloches.
- Block 5: Observation block with one observation cloche (VDP) and one GFM cloche.
- Ammunition entry: one JM/AC37 embrasure and two GFM cloches.
- Personnel entry: one grenade launcher cloche (LG), three JM embrasures, one JM/AC37 embrasure and one GFM cloche.

=== Casemates and shelters ===
In addition to the connected combat blocks, a series of detached casemates and infantry shelters surround Mont des Welches, including

- Abri de Klang: Subterranean infantry shelter (abri-caverne) (Note: An abri is an infantry shelter, sometimes underground or under earth cover. An abri in the main Maginot Line often closely resembles a casemate, but is more lightly armed and can hold more occupants.) with two gun embrasures and two GFM cloches.
- Abri du Mont des Welches: Surface abri with two GFM cloches.
- Casemate de Menskirch: Double block with two JM/AC47 embrasure, two JM embrasures and two GFM cloches.

== Manning ==
The manning of the ouvrage in June 1940 comprised 490 men and 17 officers of the 167th Fortress Infantry Regiment and the 151st Position Artillery Regiment, commanded by Chef de Bataillon Tari. The units were under the umbrella of the 42nd Fortress Corps of the 3rd Army, Army Group 2.

The Casernement de Férange provided peacetime above-ground barracks and support services to Michelsberg and other positions in the area.

== History ==
See Fortified Sector of Boulay for a broader discussion of the Boulay sector of the Maginot Line.

=== 1940 ===
No attempt was made by the Germans to directly attack this central portion of the Maginot Line, the Germans preferring to go around the west end of the Line and take the Line from the rear. Mont des Welches provided covering fire to other ouvrages in the area through June as the Germans advanced eastwards behind French lines. On 15 June the German 1st Army broke through the Line at the Saar and pushed west and east along the Line, enveloping the French armies. The German 95th Infantry Division under von Amim advanced on Mont des Welches on 21 June, with advance patrols taking fire the same day. An assault using 8.8cm guns was mounted against Blocks 2 and 3, but was disrupted by fire from the entry block's cloches. Artillery fire from blocks 4 and 6 and fire from the personnel entry destroyed a German battery. Hackenberg joined to provide further support. The fort remained under French control until the armistice of 25 June 1940. Mont des Welches's garrison evacuated on 4 July 1940. Mont des Welches was partially appropriated by the Reichspost, serving as a depot for post office equipment.

=== 1944 ===
During the Lorraine Campaign only Hackenberg was occupied by the Germans; Mont des Welches played no role in that campaign.

=== Cold War ===
Following World War II, interest revived in the use of the Maginot Line to defend against a possible Soviet advance through southern Germany. Funds were allocated for restoration of the gros ouvrages Work was limited to restoration of systems and improvements to existing armament. The renovations did not include the command post or the barracks. By 1956, Mont des Welches had been designated part of the Mòle de Boulay, a strongpoint in the northeastern defenses against Soviet attack. By the late 1950s interest in fixed fortifications was waning after France developed a nuclear deterrent. The money needed to maintain and upgrade the fortifications was diverted for the nuclear programs. Mont des Welches was maintained for use by the Army until 1971 when it was placed in second-class reserve.

== Current condition ==
Much of the fortification's equipment has been removed for use in other Maginot museums. The lands remain military property. The entrances have been buried.

== See also ==
- List of all works on Maginot Line
- Siegfried Line
- Atlantic Wall
- Czechoslovak border fortifications

== Bibliography ==
- Allcorn, William. The Maginot Line 1928-45. Oxford: Osprey Publishing, 2003. ISBN 1-84176-646-1
- Kaufmann, J.E. and Kaufmann, H.W. Fortress France: The Maginot Line and French Defenses in World War II, Stackpole Books, 2006. ISBN 0-275-98345-5
- Kaufmann, J.E., Kaufmann, H.W., Jancovič-Potočnik, A. and Lang, P. The Maginot Line: History and Guide, Pen and Sword, 2011. ISBN 978-1-84884-068-3
- Mary, Jean-Yves; Hohnadel, Alain; Sicard, Jacques. Hommes et Ouvrages de la Ligne Maginot, Tome 1. Paris, Histoire & Collections, 2001. ISBN 2-908182-88-2 (in French)
- Mary, Jean-Yves; Hohnadel, Alain; Sicard, Jacques. Hommes et Ouvrages de la Ligne Maginot, Tome 2. Paris, Histoire & Collections, 2003. ISBN 2-908182-97-1 (in French)
- Mary, Jean-Yves; Hohnadel, Alain; Sicard, Jacques. Hommes et Ouvrages de la Ligne Maginot, Tome 3. Paris, Histoire & Collections, 2003. ISBN 2-913903-88-6 (in French)
- Mary, Jean-Yves; Hohnadel, Alain; Sicard, Jacques. Hommes et Ouvrages de la Ligne Maginot, Tome 5. Paris, Histoire & Collections, 2009. ISBN 978-2-35250-127-5 (in French)
