= Ouvrage Soetrich =

Ouvrage of the Maginot Line

- Part of Maginot Line
- North-East France
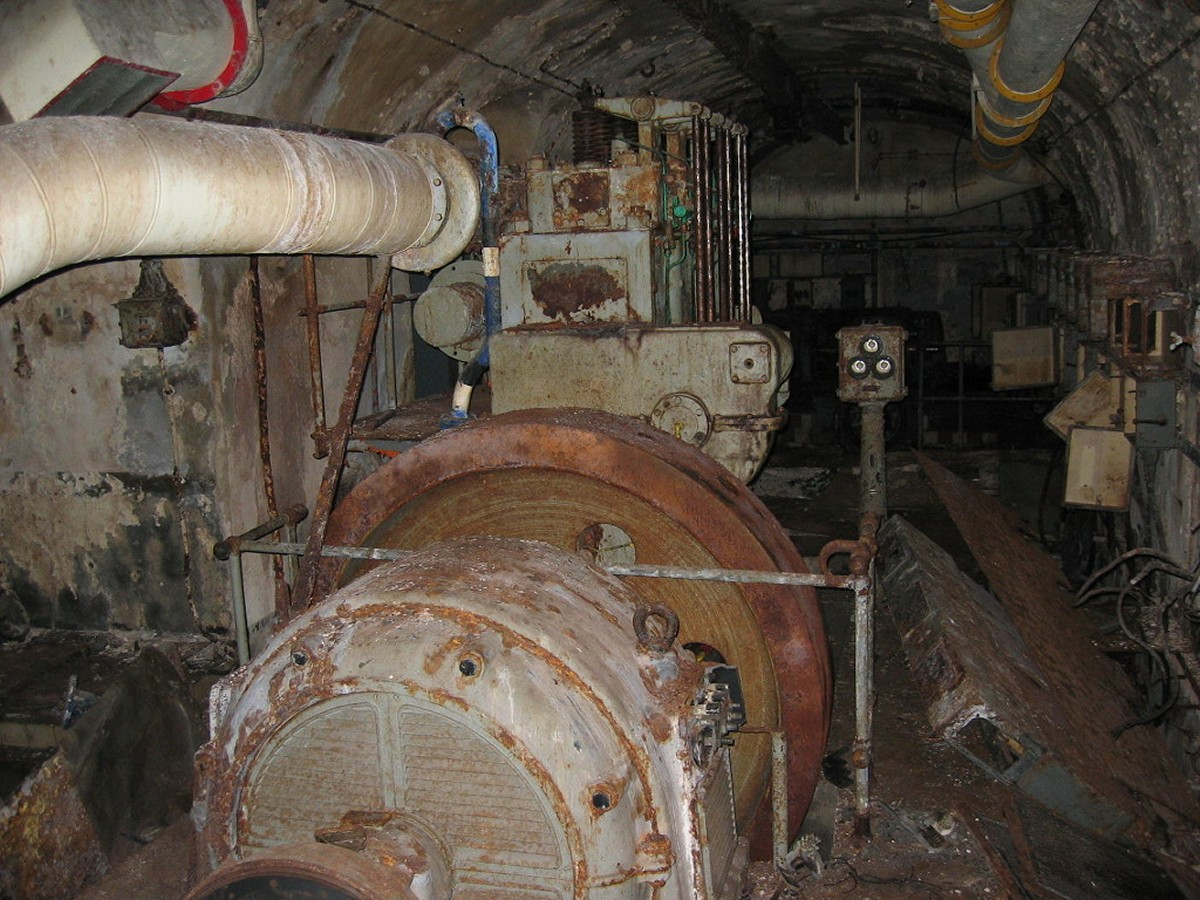
- The usine of Soetrich, May 2004

Site information
- Controlled by: France
- Open to the public: No
- Condition: Abandoned, buried

Location
- Coordinates: 49.43011°N 6.16928°E

Site history
- Built by: CORF
- Materials: Concrete, steel, deep excavation
- Battles/wars: Battle of France, Lorraine Campaign

Ouvrage Soetrich is a gros ouvrage of the Maginot Line in north-eastern France. Soetrich is located between petits ouvrages Immerhof and Bois Karre, facing the France-Luxembourg border near the town of Hettange-Grande, part of the Fortified Sector of Thionville. Compared with other gros ouvrages, Soetrich is compact in arrangement, with the entries and underground ammunition magazines and barracks in close proximity to the combat blocks, accessed through underground galleries at an average depth of 30 metres (98 ft). Its primary purpose was to cover the main road to Luxembourg, just to the west. Along with its neighbours, Ouvrage Rochonvillers and Ouvrage Molvange, Soetrich was used during the Cold War as a secure command centre for NATO forces.

== Design and construction ==
The Soetrich site was surveyed by CORF (Commission d'Organisation des Régions Fortifiées), the Maginot Line's design and construction agency, in 1930. Work by the contractor Degaine-Dubois began the same year, and the position became operational in 1935, at a cost of 86 million francs.

Soetrich stands just to the east of the Thionville-Luxembourg road. A military road and a 60 cm narrow-gauge railway link the entrance blocks to the rear supply areas. The railway continues through the ouvrage (Note: English-language sources use the French term ouvrage as the preferred term for the Maginot positions, in preference to "fort", a term usually reserved for older fortifications with passive defensives in the form of walls and ditches. The literal translation of ouvrage in the sense of a fortification in English is "work." A gros ouvrage is a large fortification with a significant artillery component, while a petit ouvrage is smaller, with lighter arms.) to the combat blocks. The combat and support areas are separated by only 125 metres (410 ft), and the total length of the main gallery is 625 metres (2,051 ft).

== Description ==
The ouvrage comprises two entries and six closely grouped combat blocks:

- Ammunition entry: shaft, two automatic rifle cloches (GFM) and one machine gun/47 mm anti-tank gun (JM/AC47) embrasure.
- Personnel entry: shaft, one GFM cloche and one JM/AC47 embrasure.
- Block 1: Infantry block with one machine gun turret, one machine gun cloche (JM) and one GFM cloche.
- Block 2: Infantry block with one machine gun turret, one observation cloche (VDP) and one GFM cloche.
- Block 3: Infantry block with one JM/AC47 embrasure, one JM embrasure, two 81 mm mortar embrasures and two GFM cloches.
- Block 4: Artillery block with one 135 mm gun turret and one GFM cloche.
- Block 5: Artillery block with one 75 mm gun turret and one GFM cloche.
- Block 6: Artillery block with one 75 mm gun turret, one GFM cloche and one grenade launcher cloche (LG).

=== Casemates, observation points and shelters ===
The Observatoire de la Route du Luxembourg is just to the west to the ouvrage, on the other side of the main road to Luxembourg. It was equipped with an observation cloche and a GFM cloche. Just to the south is the Abri de la Route du Luxembourg (Note: An abri is an infantry shelter, sometimes underground or under earth cover. An abri in the main Maginot Line often closely resembles a casemate, but is more lightly armed and can hold more occupants.), which sheltered a section of infantry that supported the observatory and the flank of the ouvrage.

Several other casemates, observatories and infantry shelters are located around Soetrich, including

- Observatoire de Boust: One observation cloche and one GFM cloche.
- Casemate de Boust: Single block with one JM/AC37 embrasure, one JM embrasure, and two GFM cloches.
- Abri Helmriech: Subsurface shelter for two infantry sections and a command post, with two GFM cloches.
- Abri Barrungshof: Surface shelter for two infantry sections, two GFM cloches.

None of these are connected to the ouvrage or to each other. All were built by CORF. The Casernement de Hettange-Grande provided peacetime above-ground barracks and support services to Soetrich and other ouvrages in the area.

== Manning ==
Under the orders of Commandant Henger, the garrison comprised 583 men and 20 officers of the 169th Fortress Infantry Regiment (RIF) and the 151st Position Artillery Regiment (RAP). The units were under the umbrella of the 42nd Fortress Corps of the 3rd Army, Army Group 2.

== History ==
See Fortified Sector of Thionville for a broader discussion of the events of 1940 in the Thionville sector of the Maginot Line.

Soetrich came under bombardment by German forces in June 1940, without much effect. Soetrich surrendered with other positions on its sector as a result of the Second Armistice at Compiègne. No significant action is recorded concerning Soetrich during the Lorraine Campaign of 1944.

After the war, most of the gros ouvrages were reconditioned for continued service. However, the 75 mm turrets in Soetrich's blocks 5 and 6 were removed in 1953. In 1960 Rochonvillers and Molvange were offered to NATO for use as secure command centres. Soon after, Soetrich was added to the offer. Soetrich was renovated for this purpose at a cost of 54 million francs, using its ammunition magazine and underground barracks spaces for the purpose and largely abandoning the combat blocks.

The ouvrage is no longer used by the French Army and the entries are now buried to prevent unauthorised entry.

== See also ==
- List of all works on Maginot Line
- Siegfried Line
- Atlantic Wall
- Czechoslovak border fortifications

== Bibliography ==
- Allcorn, William. The Maginot Line 1928-45. Oxford: Osprey Publishing, 2003. ISBN 1-84176-646-1
- Kaufmann, J.E. and Kaufmann, H.W. Fortress France: The Maginot Line and French Defenses in World War II, Stackpole Books, 2006. ISBN 0-275-98345-5
- Kaufmann, J.E., Kaufmann, H.W., Jancovič-Potočnik, A. and Lang, P. The Maginot Line: History and Guide, Pen and Sword, 2011. ISBN 978-1-84884-068-3
- Mary, Jean-Yves; Hohnadel, Alain; Sicard, Jacques. Hommes et Ouvrages de la Ligne Maginot, Tome 1. Paris, Histoire & Collections, 2001. ISBN 2-908182-88-2 (in French)
- Mary, Jean-Yves; Hohnadel, Alain; Sicard, Jacques. Hommes et Ouvrages de la Ligne Maginot, Tome 2. Paris, Histoire & Collections, 2003. ISBN 2-908182-97-1 (in French)
- Mary, Jean-Yves; Hohnadel, Alain; Sicard, Jacques. Hommes et Ouvrages de la Ligne Maginot, Tome 3. Paris, Histoire & Collections, 2003. ISBN 2-913903-88-6 (in French)
- Mary, Jean-Yves; Hohnadel, Alain; Sicard, Jacques. Hommes et Ouvrages de la Ligne Maginot, Tome 5. Paris, Histoire & Collections, 2009. ISBN 978-2-35250-127-5 (in French)
