= Ouvrage Immerhof =

Ouvrage of the Maginot Line

- Part of Maginot Line
- Northeast France
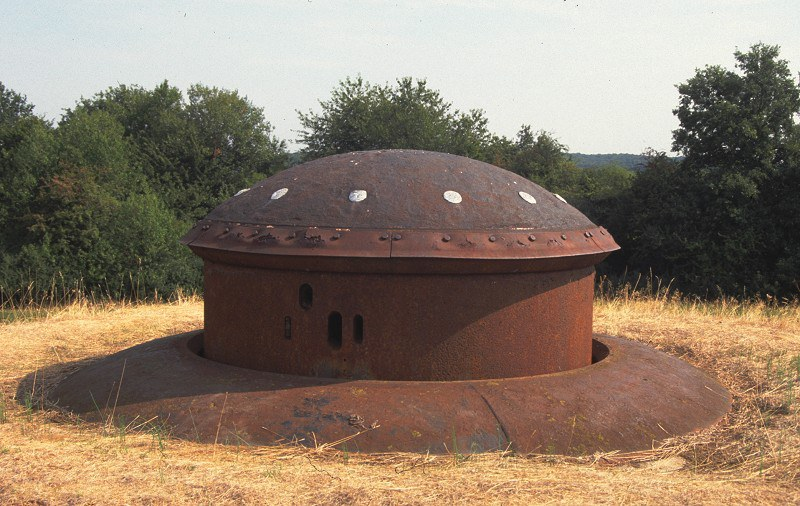
- Machine gun turret, Block 2

Site information
- Owner: Town of Hettange-Grande
- Controlled by: France
- Open to the public: Yes
- Condition: Preserved

Location
- Coordinates: 49.42508°N 6.13564°E

Site history
- Built by: CORF
- Materials: Concrete, steel, deep excavation
- Battles/wars: Battle of France, Lorraine Campaign

Garrison information
- Current commander: Commandant Réquiston

Ouvrage Immerhof, also known as Ouvrage Ferme-Immerhof, is one of the largest petit ouvrages of the Maginot Line of north-east, France. Located near the community of Hettange-Grande, it is 7 km north of Thionville between the gros ouvrages of Molvange and Soetrich, the closest ouvrage to the Luxembourg frontier. It was part of the Fortified Sector of Thionville, in the Fortified Region of Metz, the strongest portion of the Line. Apart from its function as a communication post between the neighbouring gros ouvrages, Immerhof also controlled the road and railway routes from Luxembourg, which pass in the immediate vicinity. In addition, Immerhof protected other Maginot works in the vicinity: the casemates of Kanfen, the infantry shelter of Stressling, the observation point and shelter of Hettange-Grande, and a number of nearby blockhouses constructed during the Phoney War.

Built between 1930 and 1935, Immerhof saw little action. After a renovation for continued use after World War II, the position was sold to the nearby community of Hettange-Grande in 1974 for use as a museum.

== Design and construction ==
The Immerhof farm site was surveyed by CORF (Commission d'Organisation des Régions Fortifiées), the Maginot Line's design and construction agency, in 1930. Work by the contractor Duval of Nancy began in 1931, and the position became operational in 1935, at a cost of 31 million francs.

Immerhof was the only ouvrage to be built using entirely cut-and-cover techniques, with no tunnelling, due to poor soil conditions. A high water table meant that the drinking water well was only 28 metres (92 ft) deep; no deep drain could be constructed under the galleries due to the shallow water table. The position was constructed entirely in reinforced concrete, as opposed to unreinforced mass concrete, causing a significant cost increase. It was named after a nearby farm.

== Description ==
The ouvrage (Note: English-language sources use the French term ouvrage as the preferred term for the Maginot positions, in preference to "fort", a term usually reserved for older fortifications with passive defensives in the form of walls and ditches. The literal translation of ouvrage in the sense of a fortification in English is "work." A gros ouvrage is a large fortification with a significant artillery component, while a petit ouvrage is smaller, with lighter arms.) consists of four closely grouped combat blocks. The underground barracks is arranged in a unique two-level configuration.

- Block 1: Infantry block with two GFM cloches and one machine gun turret.
- Block 2: Infantry block with two GFM cloches and one machine gun turret, mirroring Block 1.
- Block 3: Infantry block with one GFM cloche, one 81 mm mortar turret, four machine gun embrasures and one machine gun/47 mm anti-tank gun embrasure (JM/AC47), with an emergency exit.
- Block 4: Entry block with two GFM cloches, one grenade launcher cloche, four machine gun embrasures and one JM/AC47 embrasure.

=== Casemates, observation points and shelters ===
The Observatoire de la Route du Luxembourg is located to the east, very close to Soetrich, in a position to watch the main road to Luxembourg. It was equipped with an observation cloche and a GFM cloche. Just to the south is the Abri de la Route du Luxembourg (Note: An abri is an infantry shelter, sometimes underground or under earth cover. An abri in the main Maginot Line often closely resembles a casemate, but is more lightly armed and can hold more occupants.), which sheltered a section of infantry that supported the observatory and the flank of the ouvrage. While in close proximity to Soetrich, these fortifications actually reported to Immerhof.

Several other casemates, observatories and infantry shelters are located around Soetrich, including

- Observatoire de Hettange-Grande: One observation cloche and one GFM cloche.
- Abri d'Hettange-Grande: Surface shelter for two infantry sections and a command post, with two GFM cloches.
- Abri du Stressling: Surface shelter for one infantry section, two GFM cloches.
- Abri de l'Helmreich: Subsurface shelter for two infantry sections and the quarter command post, two GFM cloches.

None of these are connected to the ouvrage or to each other. All were built by CORF. The Casernement de Hettange-Grande provided peacetime above-ground barracks and support services to Immerhof and other ouvrages in the area.

== History ==
See Fortified Sector of Thionville for a broader discussion of the events of 1940 in the Thionville sector of the Maginot Line.

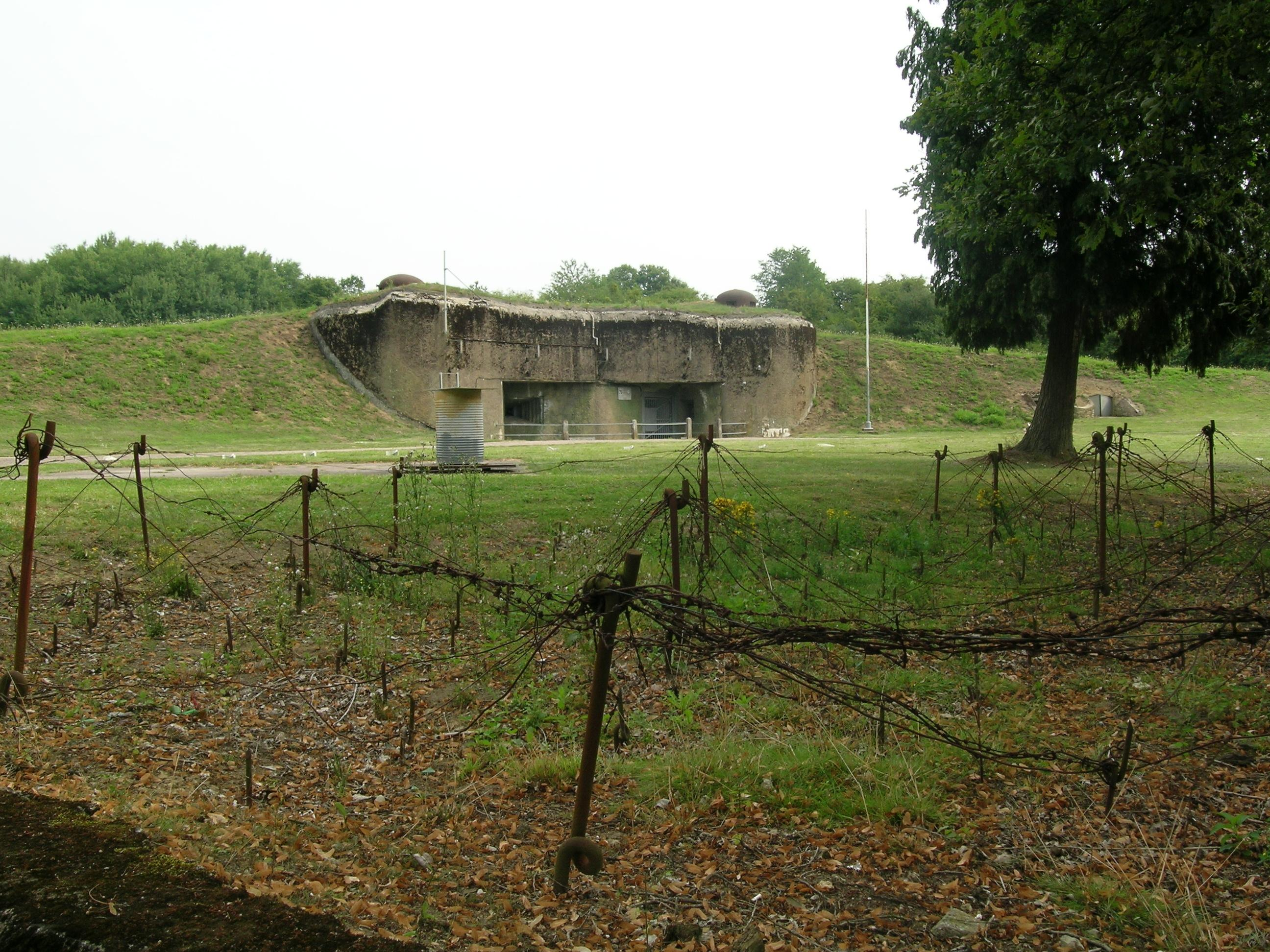
Immerhof entry with infantry obstacles

Immerhof saw little action during 1940, at most seeing harassing fire, resulting in the death of Corporal Andé Rabu on 14 June. German forces bypassed the area in the days leading up to the Second Armistice at Compiègne. The Immerhof garrison, under the command of Captain Réquiston, surrendered to the German occupiers on 30 June 1940.

In the 1950s the French government became concerned about a possible invasion by the Warsaw Pact through Germany. Immerhof and many of the larger positions were renovated for further use. By 1953, Immerhof had become a part of the fortified môle de Rochonvillers along with Molvange, Rochonvillers and Bréhain. After France's withdrawal from the NATO integrated command structure, the ouvrage was abandoned. In 1974 the position was sold to Hettange-Grande as a museum.

== Current status ==
The ouvrage has been maintained as a museum since 1975. It remains in a good state of preservation, a condition attributed to the unusual attention given to drainage of groundwater while the site was open to the sky for construction, something not possible in tunnelled positions.

== See also ==
- List of all works on Maginot Line
- Siegfried Line
- Atlantic Wall
- Czechoslovak border fortifications

== Bibliography ==
- Allcorn, William. The Maginot Line 1928-45. Oxford: Osprey Publishing, 2003. ISBN 1-84176-646-1
- Degon, André; Zylberyng, Didier, La Ligne Maginot: Guide des Forts à Visiter, Editions Ouest-France, 2014. ISBN 978-2-7373-6080-0 (in French)
- Kaufmann, J.E. and Kaufmann, H.W. Fortress France: The Maginot Line and French Defenses in World War II, Stackpole Books, 2006. ISBN 0-275-98345-5
- Kaufmann, J.E., Kaufmann, H.W., Jancovič-Potočnik, A. and Lang, P. The Maginot Line: History and Guide, Pen and Sword, 2011. ISBN 978-1-84884-068-3
- Mary, Jean-Yves; Hohnadel, Alain; Sicard, Jacques. Hommes et Ouvrages de la Ligne Maginot, Tome 1. Paris, Histoire & Collections, 2001. ISBN 2-908182-88-2 (in French)
- Mary, Jean-Yves; Hohnadel, Alain; Sicard, Jacques. Hommes et Ouvrages de la Ligne Maginot, Tome 2. Paris, Histoire & Collections, 2003. ISBN 2-908182-97-1 (in French)
- Mary, Jean-Yves; Hohnadel, Alain; Sicard, Jacques. Hommes et Ouvrages de la Ligne Maginot, Tome 3. Paris, Histoire & Collections, 2003. ISBN 2-913903-88-6 (in French)
- Mary, Jean-Yves; Hohnadel, Alain; Sicard, Jacques. Hommes et Ouvrages de la Ligne Maginot, Tome 5. Paris, Histoire & Collections, 2009. ISBN 978-2-35250-127-5 (in French)
