= Casemate du Grand-Lot =

Coordinates: 49.4075°N 6.0625°E

The casemate du Grand-Lot is an interval casemate CORF of the Maginot Line, located in the city of Escherange, in the Lorraine region of France.

== Position over the line ==
As part of the Angevillers or Œutrange subsector (the two names were used) in the fortified sector of Thionville, the Casemate du Grand-Lot, wearing the designation C 36, is integrated into the "main line of resistance "Between the Rochonvillers work (A 8, whose block 9 is detached near the casemate) to the south-west and the casemate of Escherange West (C 37) to the north-east, within the cross-shot range of the cannons of ouvrage Rochonvillers in the south-west and Molvange in the north-east.

== Description ==
This double casemate was equipped with two GFM bells, two combinations for Reibel twinning and 47 mm anti-tank gun and two other Reibel twinning slots alone. To the rear of each bell was an armoured position for a searchlight. The position was entered by means of a footbridge.

== History ==
The casemate was ordered in 1940 by Lieutenant Klein. The west shooting room covered the highway D 58, which connects the villages of Angevillers and Escherange to the west and block 9 of the Rochonvillers GO (block 9 can be seen from the western bell of the casemate). The shooting room covered the casemate of Escherange Ouest.

== Current state ==
The casemate has been restored and is now private property, open on certain occasions to the public.
