= List of Maginot Line ouvrages =

Here is the list of all ouvrages of the Maginot Line, organized by sector and type of fortification. Ouvrage translates as "works" in English: published documents in both English and French refer to these fortifications in this manner, rather than as "forts". An ouvrage typically consists of a series of concrete-encased strongpoints, linked by tunnels.

For a list of the ouvrages of the Alpine Line, or Little Maginot Line, see List of Alpine Line ouvrages.

== Belgian border ==
=== Fortified Sector of the Escaut ===
==== Ouvrage ====
- Ouvrage d'Eth

==== Casemates ====
- Casemate de Tallandier
- Casemate de Jeanlain
- Casemate de Notre Dame d'Amour
- Casemate du Mont des Bruyères
- Casemate de la Ferme des Rosières
- Casemate de Marlières
- Casemate de Haute Rive
- Casemate de Drève St Antoine
- Casemate de Lièvre Ouest
- Casemate de Lièvre Est
- Casemate de Trieux d'Escaupont Ouest
- Casemate de Trieux d'Escaupont Est
- Casemate du Cimetière d'Escaupont Ouest
- Casemate du Cimetière d'Escaupont Est

=== Fortified Sector of Maubeuge ===
==== Ouvrages ====
- Ouvrage des Sarts
- Ouvrage de Bersillies
- Ouvrage de la Salmagne
- Ouvrage de Boussois

==== Casemates ====
- Casemate de Héronfontaine
- Casemate de Crèvecoeur
- Casemate d'Epinette
- Casemate de Rocq
- Casemate de Marpent Nord
- Casemate de Marpent Sud
- Casemate d'Ostergnies
- Casemate de Gommegnies Ouest
- Casemate de Gommegnies Est
- Casemate du Cheval Blanc
- Casemate de Tréchon
- Casemate de Clare
- Casemate d'Obies
- Casemate de Bonwez
- Casemate du Vivier Nuthiau Ouest
- Casemate du Vivier Nuthiau Est
- Casemate de la Haute Rue
- Casemate de la Porquerie Ouest
- Casemate de la Porquerie Est
- Casemate d'Hurtebise

=== Fortified Sector of Montmédy ===
==== Ouvrages ====
- Ouvrage La Ferté
- Ouvrage Chesnois
- Ouvrage Thonnelle
- Ouvrage Velosnes

==== Casemates ====
- Casemate de Margut
- Casemate de Moiry
- Casemate de Sainte-Marie
- Casemate de Sapogne
- Casemate de Christ
- Casemate de Thonne-le-Thil
- Casemate de Guerlette
- Casemate d'Avioth
- Casemate de Fresnois
- Casemate de Saint-Antoine
- Casemate d'Ecouviez Ouest
- Casemate d'Ecouviez Est

== Fortified Region of Metz ==
=== Fortified Sector of the Crusnes ===
==== Ouvrages ====
- Ouvrage Ferme Chappy (PO)
- Ouvrage Fermont (GO)
- Ouvrage Latiremont (GO)
- Ouvrage Mauvais-Bois (PO)
- Ouvrage Bois-du-Four (PO)
- Ouvrage Bréhain(GO)
- Ouvrage Aumetz (PO)

==== Casemates ====
- Casemate de Puxieux
- Casemate du Bois-de-Beuveille
- Casemate du Haut-de-l'Anguille Ouest
- Casemate du Haut-de-l'Anguille Est
- Casemate du Bois-de-Tappe Ouest
- Casemate du Bois-de-Tappe Est
- Casemate de l'Ermitage St Quentin
- Casemate de Praucourt
- Casemate de Jalaumont Ouest
- Casemate de Jalaumont Est
- Casemate de Chénières Ouest
- Casemate de Chénières Est
- Casemate de Laix
- Casemate de Morfontaine
- Casemate de Villers la Montagne Ouest
- Casemate de Villers la Montagne Centre
- Casemate de Villers la Montagne Est
- Casemate de Verbusch Ouest
- Casemate de Verbusch Est
- Casemate de la Ferme Thiery
- Casemate de Bourène Ouest
- Casemate de Bourène Est
- Casemate Ouest de Bréhain
- Casemate du Ravin de Crusnes
- Casemate de Crusnes Ouest
- Casemate de Crusnes Est
- Casemate du Nouveau Crusnes Ouest
- Casemate du Nouveau Crusnes Est
- Casemate du Réservoir
- Casemate de la Route d'Ottange Ouest
- Casemate de la Route d'Ottange Centre
- Casemate de la Route d'Ottange Est
- Casemate de Tressange
- Casemate de Bure
- Casemate du Fond d'Havange
- Casemate du Gros Bois

==== Shelters ====
- Abri du Gros Bois

==== Observatories ====
- Observatoire de Puxieux
- Observatiore de l'Haut-de-l'Anguille
- Observatoire du Haut-de-la-Vigne
- Observatoire de la Ferme du Bois du Four
- Observatoire du Réservoir

==== Safety camps ====
- Camp de Doncourt
- Camp de Morfontaine
- Camp d'Errouville
- Camp de Ludelange

=== Fortified Sector of Thionville ===
==== Ouvrages ====
- Ouvrage Rochonvillers (GO)
- Ouvrage Molvange (GO)
- Ouvrage Soetrich (GO)
- Ouvrage Kobenbusch (GO)
- Ouvrage Galgenberg (GO)
- Ouvrage Métrich (GO)
- Ouvrage Billig (GO)
- Ouvrage Immerhof (PO)
- Ouvrage Bois Karre (PO)
- Ouvrage Oberheid (PO)
- Ouvrage Sentzich (PO)

==== Casemates ====
- Casemate du Grand Lot
- Casemate d'Escherange Ouest
- Casemate d'Escherange Est
- Casemate du Petersberg Ouest
- Casemate du Petersberg Est
- Casemate d'Entrange
- Casemate du Bois de Kanfen Ouest
- Casemate du Bois de Kanfen Est
- Casemate de Boust
- Casemate de Basse-Parthe Ouest
- Casemate de Basse-Parthe Est
- Casemate du Sonnenberg
- Casemate de Koenigsmacker Nord
- Casemate de Koenigsmacker Sud
- Casemate de Métrich Nord
- Casemate de Métrich Sud
- Casemate du Bois de Koenigsmacker

==== Shelters ====
- Abri du Grand Lot (caverne)
- Abri du Bois d'Escherange (caverne)
- Abri du Petersberg (caverne)
- Abri du Zeiterholz (surface)
- Abri du Bois de Kanfen (surface)
- Abri du Stressling (surface)
- Abri d'Hettange-Grande (surface)
- Abri de la Route de Luxembourg (surface)
- Abri de l'Helmreich (caverne)
- Abri du Barrungshof (surface)
- Abri du Bois Karre (surface)
- Abri du Rippert (surface)
- Abri du Bois de Cattenom (surface)
- Abri du Krekelbusch (caverne)
- Abri de Métrich (caverne)
- Abri du Nonnenberg (caverne)
- Abri du Bichel Nord (surface)
- Abri du Bichel Sud (surface)

==== Observatories ====
- Observatoire de Hettange-Grande
- Observatoire de la Route de Luxembourg
- Observatoire de Boust
- Observatoire de Cattenom

==== Safety camps ====
- Camp d'Angevillers
- Camp d'Hettange-Grande
- Camp de Cattenom
- Camp d'Elzange

==== Old German forts ====
- Fort d'Illange
- Fort de Guentrange
- Fort de Koenigsmacker

=== Fortified Sector of Boulay ===
==== Ouvrages ====
- Ouvrage Hackenberg (GO)
- Ouvrage Mont des Welches (GO)
- Ouvrage Michelsberg (GO)
- Ouvrage Anzeling (GO)
- Ouvrage Coucou (PO)
- Ouvrage Hobling (PO)
- Ouvrage Bousse (PO)
- Ouvrage Berenbach (PO)
- Ouvrage Bovenberg (PO)
- Ouvrage Denting (PO)
- Ouvrage Village de Coume (PO)
- Ouvrage Annexe Nord de Coume (PO)
- Ouvrage Coume (PO)
- Ouvrage Annexe Sud de Coume (PO)
- Ouvrage Mottemberg (PO)

==== Casemates ====
- Casemate du Bovenberg
- Casemate du Bois d'Ottonville
- Casemate du Hummersberg Nord
- Casemate du Hummersberg Sud
- Casemate de Veckring Nord
- Casemate de Veckring Sud
- Casemate de Menskirch
- Casemate du Huberbusch Ouest
- Casemate du Huberbusch Est
- Casemate d'Edling Ouest
- Casemate d'Edling Est
- Casemate d'Eblange
- Casemate de Langhep Ouest
- Casemate de Langhep Est
- Casemate du Bisterberg Nord I
- Casemate du Bisterberg Nord II
- Casemate du Bisterberg Sud III
- Casemate du Bisterberg Sud IIII
- Casemate sud du Mottemberg

==== Observatories ====
- Observatoire des Chênes Brulés
- Observatoire de Hestroff

==== Shelters ====
- Abri du Hummersberg (caverne)
- Abri de Veckring (caverne)
- Abri du Coucou (surface)
- Abri des Chênes Brulés (caverne)
- Abri de Klang (caverne)
- Abri du Mont des Welches (surface)
- Abri d'Ising (surface)
- Abri de Bilmette (surface)
- Abri de Férange (caverne)
- Abri de Hestroff (surface)
- Abri du Rotherberg (caverne)
- Abri de Bockange (surface)
- Abri de Gomelange (surface)
- Abri de Colming (abri-casemate de surface)

=== Fortified Sector of Faulquemont ===
==== Ouvrages ====
- Ouvrage Kerfent (PO)
- Ouvrage Bambesch (PO)
- Ouvrage Einseling (PO)
- Ouvrage Laudrefang (PO)
- Ouvrage Téting (PO)

==== Casemates ====
- Casemate du Bambesch
- Casemate de Stocken
- Casemate de Téting
- Casemate de Bambiderstroff Nord
- Casemate de Bambiderstroff Sud
- Casemate de l'Einseling Nord
- Casemate de l'Einseling Sud
- Casemate des Quatre-Vents Nord
- Casemate des Quatre-Vents Sud
- Casemate du Bois de Laudrefang Nord
- Casemate du Bois de Laudrefang Sud

== Fortified Region of the Sarre ==
=== Fortified Sector of the Sarre ===
==== Ouvrages ====
- Ouvrage Haut-Poirier

==== Casemates ====
- Casemate de Wittring
- Casemate du Grand-Bois
- Casemate du Nord-Ouest d'Achen
- Casemate du Nord d'Achen
- Casemate du Nord-Est d'Achen

== Fortified Region of the Lauter ==
=== Fortified Sector of Rohrbach ===
==== Gros ouvrages ====
- Ouvrage Simserhof
- Ouvrage Schiesseck

==== Petits Ouvrages ====
- Ouvrage Welschof
- Ouvrage Rohrbach
- Ouvrage Otterbiel

==== Casemates ====
- Casemate Ouest de Singling
- Casemate Nord-Ouest de Singling Gauche
- Casemate Nord-Ouest de Singling Droite
- Casemate de Bining
- Casemate de la Station-de-Rohrbach
- Casemate de Rohrbach
- Casemate du Sinnerberg Ouest
- Casemate du Sinnerberg Est
- Casemate du Petit-Réderching Ouest
- Casemate du Petit-Réderching Est
- Casemate du Petit-Réderching
- Casemate du Seelberg Ouest
- Casemate du Seelberg Est
- Casemate du Judenhoff
- Casemate de Hohlbach
- Casemate du Légeret
- Casemate du Freudenberg
- Casemate de Ramstein Ouest
- Casemate de Ramstein Est
- Casemate du Champ d'Aviation Ouest
- Casemate du Champ d'Aviation Est
- Casemate du Kindelberg
- Casemate de Rochat Ouest
- Casemate de Rochat Est
- Casemate du Petit-Hohékirkel
- Casemate du Grand-Hohékirkel Ouest
- Casemate du Grand-Hohékirkel Est

==== Shelters ====
- Abri de Frohmuhle (caverne)
- Abri du Légeret (caverne)
- Abri du Freudenberg (caverne)
- Abri de Reyerswiller (caverne)
- Abri du Camp (surface)

==== Observatories ====
- Observatoire du Freudenberg

=== Fortified Sector of the Vosges ===
==== Ouvrages ====
- Grand-Hohèkirkel
- Four-à-Chaux
- Ouvrage Lembach

==== Casemates ====
- Casemate du Biesenberg (artillerie)
- Casemate de Windstein (artillerie)
- Casemate de la Main-du-Prince Ouest
- Casemate de la Main-du-Prince Est
- Casemate du Biesenberg (infanterie)
- Casemate de Glasbronn
- Casemate d'Altzinsel
- Casemate de Rothenburg
- Casemate du Nonnenkopf
- Casemate du Grafenweiher Nord-Ouest
- Casemate du Grafenweiher Centre
- Casemate du Grafenweiher Est
- Casemate de Dambach Nord
- Casemate de Dambach Sud
- Casemate du Wineckerthal Ouest
- Casemate du Wineckerthal Est
- Casemate du Grunenthal
- Casemate de Windstein (infanterie)
- Casemate de La Verrerie
- Casemate de Lembach
- Casemate de Schmelzbach Ouest

==== Shelters ====
- Abri du Dépôt
- Abri de Wolfschachen

=== Fortified Sector of Haguenau ===
==== Ouvrages ====
- Ouvrage Hochwald
- Ouvrage Schoenenbourg

==== Casemates ====
- Casemate de Sschmeltzbach Est
- Casemate de Walkmuhl
- Casemate de Drachenbronn Nord
- Casemate de Drachenbronn Sud
- Casemate de Bremmelbach Nord
- Casemate de Bremmelbach Sud
- Casemate de Breitenacker Nord
- Casemate de Breitenacker Sud
- Casemate d'Ingolsheim Ouest
- Casemate d'Ingolsheim Est
- Casemate d'Hunspach-Village
- Casemate d'Hunspach-Station
- Casemate du Moulin d'Hunspach Ouest
- Casemate du Moulin d'Hunspach Est
- Casemate de Buchholzberg
- Casemate d'Hoffen Ouest
- Casemate d'Hoffen Est
- Casemate du Bois de Hoffen
- Casemate d'Aschbach Ouest
- Casemate d'Aschbach Est
- Casemate d'Oberroedern Nord
- Casemate d'Oberroedern Sud
- Casemate de La Seltz
- Casemate de Hatten Nord
- Casemate de Hatten Sud
- Casemate d'Esch
- Casemate du Bois de Rittershoffen 1
- Casemate du Bois de Rittershoffen 2
- Casemate du Bois de Rittershoffen 3
- Casemate du Bois de Rittershoffen 4
- Casemate du Bois de Rittershoffen 5
- Casemate du Bois de Rittershoffen 6
- Casemate du Bois de Koenigsbruck Nord
- Casemate du Bois de Koenigsbruck Sud
- Casemate de Kauffenheim
- casemate du Heidenbuckel
- Casemate de Rountzenheim Nord
- Casemate de Rountzenheim Sud
- Casemate d'Auenheim Nord
- Casemate d'Auenheim Sud
- Casemate du Pont-de-Seltz
- Casemate du Pont-de-Roppenheim Nord
- Casemate du Pont-de-Roppenheim Sud
- Casemate de Neuhaeuseul
- Casemate de Fort-Louis-Village
- Casemate de Fort-Louis-Ouest
- Casemate de Fort-Louis-Est

==== Shelters ====
- Abri du Birlenbach
- Abri du Grassersloch
- Abri de Schoenenbourg
- Abri du Buchholzerberg
- Abri de Hoffen
- Abri de Hatten
- Abri de la Sauer
- Abri de Koenigsbruck
- Abri de la Donau
- Abri du Heidenbuckel
- Abri de Soufflenheim
- Abri de Beinheim Nord
- Abri de Beinheim Sud
- Abri de Stattmatten

==== Observatories ====
- Observatoire d'Hunspach
- Observatoire de Hatten
- Observatoire du Hochwald
- Observatoire du Buchholzberg
