= Ouvrage Vélosnes =

- Part of Maginot Line
- Northeast France

Site information
- Owner: Lorraine region
- Controlled by: France
- Condition: Abandoned, nature preserve

Location
- Coordinates: 49.49917°N 5.45314°E

Site history
- Built by: CORF
- Materials: Concrete, steel, deep excavation
- Battles/wars: Battle of France, Lorraine Campaign

Ouvrage Vélosnes is a gros ouvrage (large work) of the Maginot Line, located in the Fortified Sector of Montmédy between the towns of Othe and Vélosnes, facing Belgium. It possesses four combat blocks and one entrance block. It is located to the east of petit ouvrage Thonnelle. The position was sabotaged and abandoned by French forces that were ordered to retreat from the exposed position in June 1940 during the Battle of France. The ouvrage is abandoned and is administered as a nature preserve.

== Design and construction ==
The site was surveyed by CORF (Commission d'Organisation des Régions Fortifiées), the Maginot Line's design and construction agency, with plan approval in 1934. Work by the contractor Demenois-Beaumont of Verdun began in 1934 at a cost of 35.3 million francs.

Vélosnes is one of four positions in the so-called Tête du Pont de Montmédy, a salient in the French defensive lines along the Belgian border. The isolated area was one of the "New Fronts" to the west of the main Maginot Line, created to defend against the increased threat of a German advance through Belgium. The New Front positions suffered from restricted funding, as well as discontinuity in the fortification lines. Large distances between fortifications compared to earlier portions of the Line made mutual support between ouvrages difficult.

== Description ==
Vélosnes is a relatively small gros ouvrage (Note: English-language sources use the French term ouvrage as the preferred term for the Maginot positions, in preference to "fort", a term usually reserved for older fortifications with passive defensives in the form of walls and ditches. The literal translation of ouvrage in the sense of a fortification in English is "work." A gros ouvrage is a large fortification with a significant artillery component, while a petit ouvrage is smaller, with lighter arms.), with its underground barracks, usine (generating plant) and ammunition magazine branching off its short main gallery just inside the entrance block. A fifth combat block was planned with a second 75mm gun turret, but was never carried out. The ouvrage occupies a hilltop site with the turret block at the summit and the entrance to the rear.

- Block 1: infantry block with two automatic rifle cloches (GFM), one mixed-arms cloche (AM) and one retractable machine gun turret.
- Block 2: infantry block with one grenade launcher cloche (LG), one AM cloche, one GFM cloche and one GFM/observation cloche.
- Block 3: infantry block with one GFM cloche, one GFM/observation cloche, one AM cloche, one twin machine gun embrasure and one machine gun/47mm anti-tank gun (JM/AC47) embrasure.
- Block 4 (unbuilt): artillery block with one 75mm twin retractable gun turret.
- Block 5: artillery block with one 75mm two-gun turret and a GFM cloche.
- Block 6: combined on-grade entrance with two automatic rifle cloches (GFM) and one machine gun/47mm anti-tank gun (JM/AC47) embrasure.

A number of small blockhouses are associated with Vélosnes, as well as four casemates:

- Casemate d'Ecouviez Ouest: Block with one AM cloche and one GFM-B cloche.
- Casemate d'Ecouviez Est: Single block with one JM/AC47 embrasure, one JM embrasure, one AM cloche and one GFM-B cloche.
- Casemate de la Laiterie: Artillery casemate with one 75mm gun embrasure and one GFM-B cloche.
- Casemate de Villecloye: Artillery casemate with one 75mm gun embrasure.

None of these are connected to the ouvrage or to each other.

== Manning ==
The 1940 manning of the ouvrage under the command of Captain Sachy comprised 246 men and 6 officers of the 155th Fortress Infantry Regiment. The units were under the umbrella of the 2nd Army, Army Group 1. The Casernement de Saint-Jean-Marville provided peacetime above-ground barracks and support services to Vélosnes and other fortifications in the area.

== History ==
See Fortified Sector of Montmédy for a broader discussion of the events of 1940 in the Montmédy sector of the Maginot Line.

From September 1939 to June 1940 the 75mm turret at Vélosnes fired 10,000 rounds at German forces and positions. During the Battle of France the garrisons of the Tête de Pont de Montmédy were ordered to withdraw the night of 10–11 June 1940 to straighten French lines, and to avoid the fate of nearby Ouvrage La Ferté, whose entire garrison was killed when it was isolated and attacked three weeks earlier. The fortifications' arms and infrastructure were sabotaged before they were abandoned. Evacuation was complete by 12 June. The German 169th Infantry Division advanced to take possession of Vélosnes and other ouvrages in the salient on 13 June 1940.

The area saw no action during the Lorraine Campaign of 1944. The interior of the ouvrage was stripped by the Germans, and again after the war by scrap dealers. However, a number of 75mm artillery rounds were found in Block 5 in 1994. The army removed the material and blocked access to the block. The openings for the missing turrets have been blocked with rails.

== Current condition ==
The site is a nature preserve administered by the Lorraine region. The ouvrage itself is a habitat for bats and is not accessible to the public. Openings are grilled off to allow access for the bats. A trail with interpretive plaques winds through the surface features.

== See also ==
- List of all works on Maginot Line
- Siegfried Line
- Atlantic Wall
- Czechoslovak border fortifications

== Bibliography ==
- Allcorn, William. The Maginot Line 1928-45. Oxford: Osprey Publishing, 2003. ISBN 1-84176-646-1
- Kaufmann, J.E. and Kaufmann, H.W. Fortress France: The Maginot Line and French Defenses in World War II, Stackpole Books, 2006. ISBN 0-275-98345-5
- Kaufmann, J.E., Kaufmann, H.W., Jancovič-Potočnik, A. and Lang, P. The Maginot Line: History and Guide, Pen and Sword, 2011. ISBN 978-1-84884-068-3
- Mary, Jean-Yves; Hohnadel, Alain; Sicard, Jacques. Hommes et Ouvrages de la Ligne Maginot, Tome 1. Paris, Histoire & Collections, 2001. ISBN 2-908182-88-2 (in French)
- Mary, Jean-Yves; Hohnadel, Alain; Sicard, Jacques. Hommes et Ouvrages de la Ligne Maginot, Tome 2. Paris, Histoire & Collections, 2003. ISBN 2-908182-97-1 (in French)
- Mary, Jean-Yves; Hohnadel, Alain; Sicard, Jacques. Hommes et Ouvrages de la Ligne Maginot, Tome 3. Paris, Histoire & Collections, 2003. ISBN 2-913903-88-6 (in French)
- Mary, Jean-Yves; Hohnadel, Alain; Sicard, Jacques. Hommes et Ouvrages de la Ligne Maginot, Tome 5. Paris, Histoire & Collections, 2009. ISBN 978-2-35250-127-5 (in French)
