= Ouvrage Molvange =

Large work, or gros ouvrage, of the Maginot Line

- Part of Maginot Line
- Northeast France
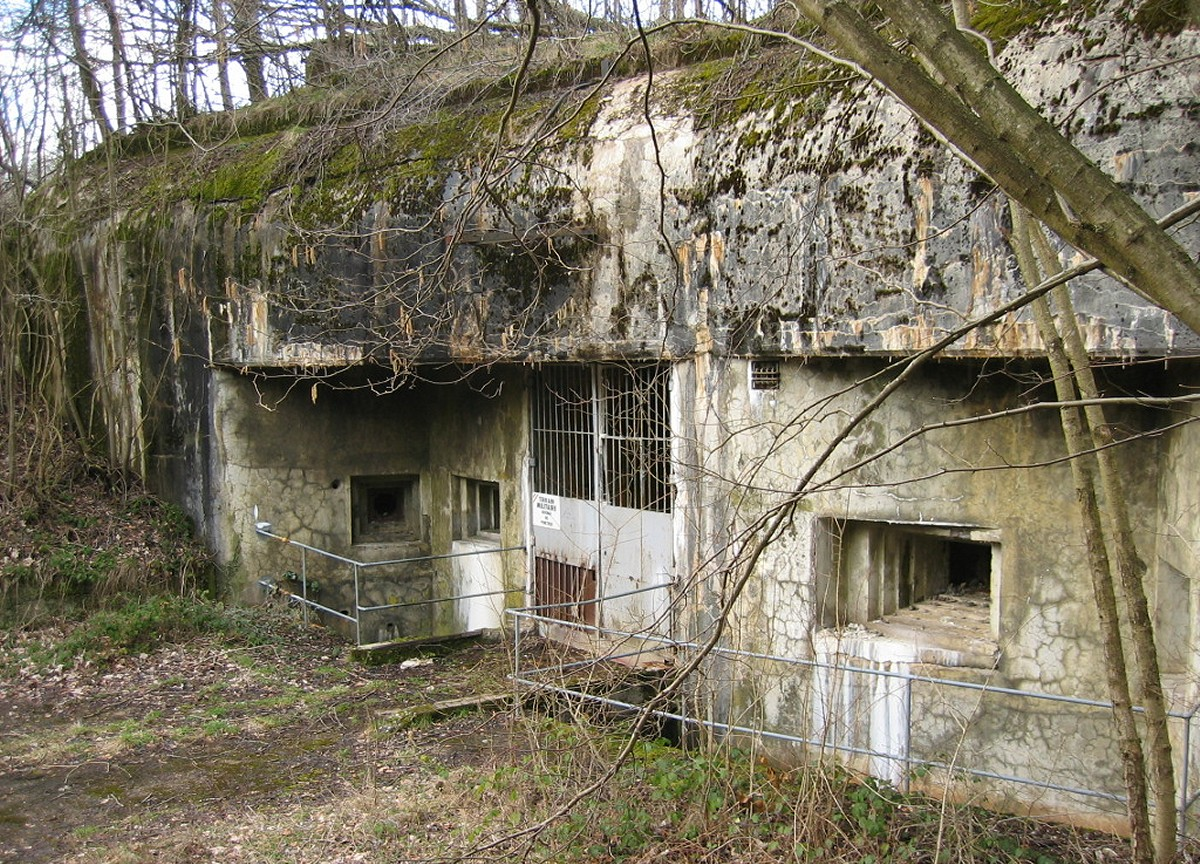
- Ammunition entry, Gros Ouvrage Molvange, March 2004

Site information
- Owner: Retained by French military
- Controlled by: France
- Open to the public: No

Location
- Coordinates: 49.41111°N 6.08361°E

Site history
- Built: 1930-35
- Built by: CORF
- Materials: Concrete, steel, deep excavation
- Battles/wars: Battle of France, Lorraine Campaign

Ouvrage Molvange is a large work, or gros ouvrage of the Maginot Line. The fortification complex faces the France-Luxembourg border from a height near Entrange in the Moselle department. The complex, armed and occupied in 1935, is located on the heights of Entrange, at an altitude of about 400 metres (1,300 ft). Molvange is flanked by the even larger Ouvrage Rochonvillers to the west and smaller petit ouvrage Immerhof to the east, part of the Fortified Sector of Thionville. Molvange was not involved in significant combat during World War II, but due to its size it was repaired and retained in service after the war. During the Cold War, Molvange's underground barracks and former ammunition magazine became a hardened military command centre.

== Design and construction ==
The Molvange site was surveyed by CORF (Commission d'Organisation des Régions Fortifiées), the Maginot Line's design and construction agency, in 1930. Work by the contractor, Quintin & Lesprit, began the same year, and the position became operational in 1935, at a cost of 106 million francs.

Molvange occupies the lip of a wooded height that runs roughly perpendicular to the fortified front, sloping steeply on the east side. Compared with Rochonvillers, its companion to the west, Molvange's entries are closer to the front. They were, however, linked to the rear via a 60 cm narrow-gauge railway, which continued through the ouvrage (Note: English-language sources use the French term ouvrage as the preferred term for the Maginot positions, in preference to "fort", a term usually reserved for older fortifications with passive defensives in the form of walls and ditches. The literal translation of ouvrage in the sense of a fortification in English is "work." A gros ouvrage is a large fortification with a significant artillery component, while a petit ouvrage is smaller, with lighter arms.) to the combat blocks.

== Description ==
The ouvrage includes two entries and nine combat blocks. As a large ouvrage, Molvange has an "M1" ammunition magazine near the entries, in the vicinity of Block 10. The underground barracks are farther out of the main gallery on the other side of Block 10. These spacious subterranean facilities would become useful as command centres after the war. The main gallery extends 1,750 metres (5,740 ft) out to Block 1, at an average depth of 30 metres (98 ft). All blocks are within a security zone and are not accessible to the public.

- Ammunition entry: an incline, two automatic rifle cloches (GFM), one machine gun/47 mm anti-tank gun embrasure (JM/AC47).
- Personnel entry: a shaft, one GFM cloche, one JM/AC47 embrasure and one machine gun embrasure.
- Block 1: Observation block with one GFM cloche, one periscope cloche (VDP) and one machine gun cloche (JM).
- Block 2: Infantry block with one machine gun turret and two GFM cloches.
- Block 3: Artillery block with one 81 mm mortar turret, one GFM cloche and one grenade launcher cloche.
- Block 4: Artillery block with one 135 mm gun turret and one GFM cloche.
- Block 5: Artillery block with one 75 mm gun turret. The turret was removed and taken to Ouvrage Fermont's museum.
- Block 6: Infantry block with one machine gun turret, one GFM cloche and one JM cloche.
- Block 7: Infantry block with one GFM cloche and one VDP cloche. A modern communications tower formerly occupied the site, removed by 2006.
- Block 8: Artillery block with 75 mm gun turret and two GFM cloches.
- Block 10: Artillery block with one 75 mm gun turret, one GFM cloche and one grenade launcher cloche (LG).

In 1939 a plan was proposed to connect Molvange to Rochonvillers via an underground galley to the Abri du Bois d'Escherange, then to the Abri du Grand Lot, and on to Rochonvillers through the existing connection. The plan never came to fruition.

=== Casemates and shelters ===
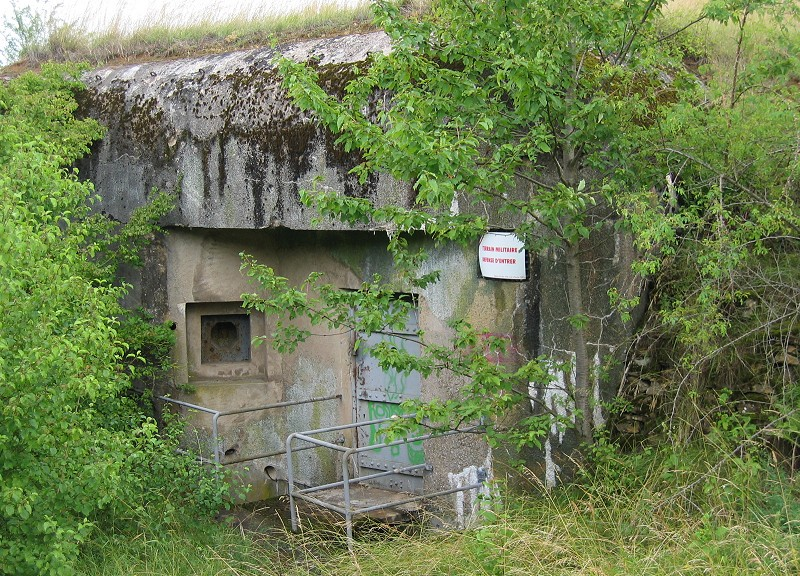
Abri du Petersberg (caverne)

The Abri du Petersberg (Note: An abri is an infantry shelter, sometimes underground or under earth cover. An abri in the main Maginot Line often closely resembles a casemate, but is more lightly armed and can hold more occupants.) is nearby in the direction of Rochonvillers 49°24′39.44″N 06°04′58.03″E, just to the west of Block 8. The infantry shelter (or abri) was armed with one mortar cloche and one GFM cloche. The Casemate d'Entrange is located at the bottom of the slope to the east of Block 1 49°25′06.97″N 06°05′59.74″E. The casemate was armed with one mortar cloche and one GFM cloche.

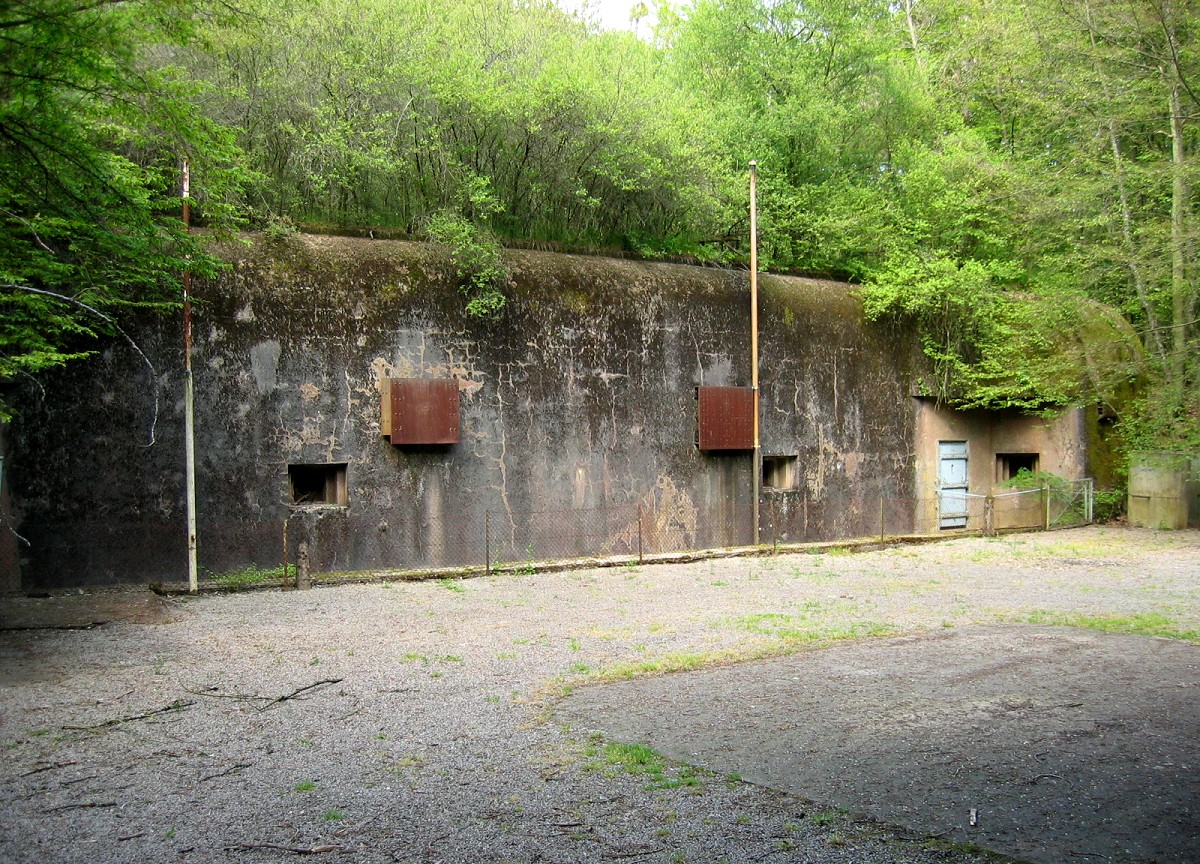
Abri du Zeiterholz (surface)

Several other casemates and infantry shelters are located to the east of Molvange, including

- Casemate du Bois-de-Kanfen Ouest: Single block with one JM/AC37 embrasure, one JM embrasure, and one GFM cloche.
- Casemate du Bois-de-Kanfen Est: Single block with one JM/AC37 embrasure, one JM embrasure, and one GFM cloche.
- Abri du Bois-de-Kanfen: Single surface shelter for two infantry sections, with two GFM cloches.
- Abri du Zeiterholz: Shelter for two infantry sections, two GFM cloches. The abri has been restored and may be visited.

None of these are connected to the ouvrage or to each other. All were built by CORF

== Manning ==
The manning of the ouvrage in 1940 comprised 711 men and 24 officers of the 169th Fortress Infantry Regiment and the 151st Position Artillery Regiment. The units were under the umbrella of the 42nd Fortress Corps of the 3rd Army, Army Group 2.

Peacetime quarters for the garrisons of Rochonvillers and Molvange were at the Camp d'Angevillers, just to the south of the Rochonvillers entries, near the town of Angevillers. With the establishment of the CENTAG wartime headquarters at Rochonvillers, the French 125th Régiment d'Instruction des Transmissions and the 2nd Régiment du Génie occupied the camp, along with the 175th Signal Company and the 208th Signal Support Company of the US Army. US Air Force units occupied portions of Molvange, which housed the 4th Allied Tactical Air Force wartime headquarters. The camp was later occupied by the 40th Régiment de Transmissions stationed at the Jeanne d'Arc barracks in Thionville and the Guyon-Gellin barracks in Hettange-Grande, near the Ouvrage Immerhof.

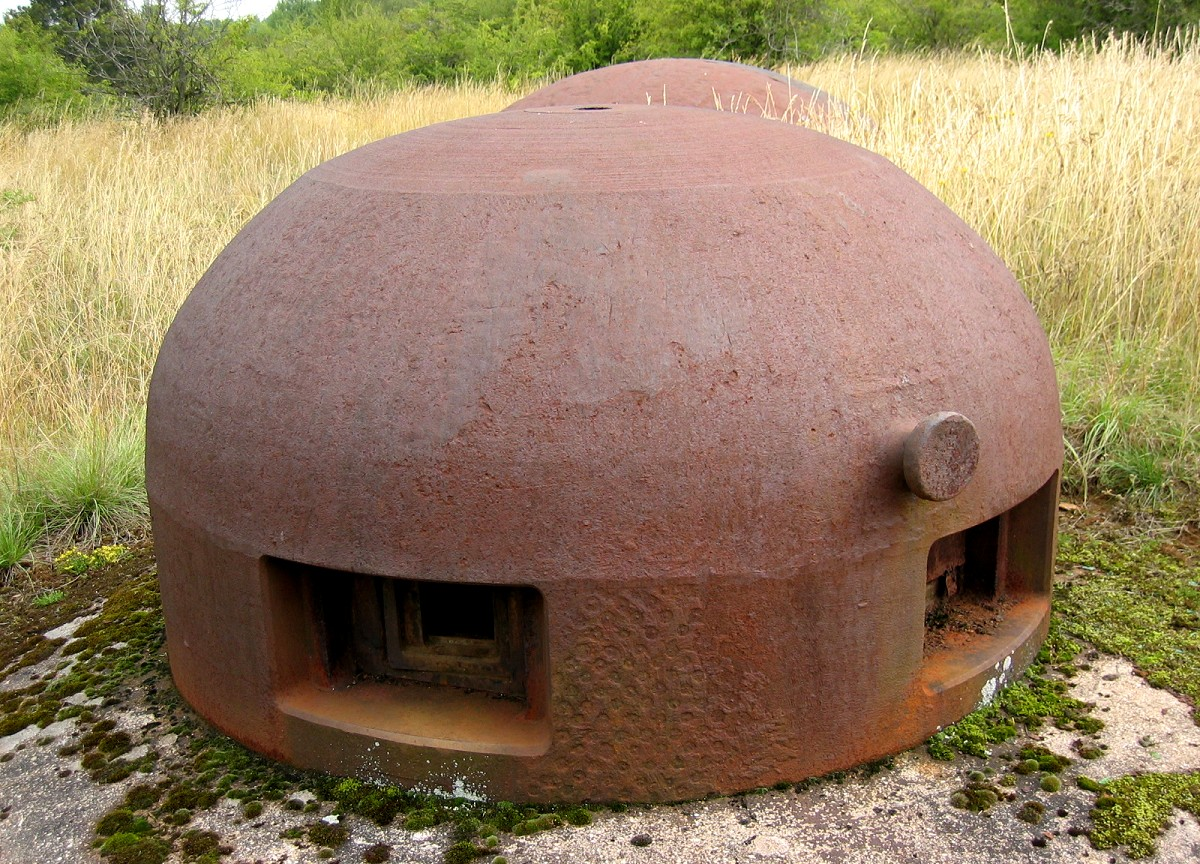
GFM cloche, Molvange Block 8

== History ==
See Fortified Sector of Thionville for a broader discussion of the events of 1940 in the Thionville sector of the Maginot Line.

Molvange did not see significant action in the Battle of France in 1940, nor in the Lorraine Campaign of 1944. The Germans largely bypassed the area, advancing along the valley of the Meuse and Saar rivers, threatening the rear of the Thionville sector. An order to fortress troops by sector commander Colonel Jean-Patrice O'Sullivan to prepare for withdrawal on June 17 was reversed by O'Sullivan. The garrison therefore remained in place and surrendered to the Germans following the Second Armistice at Compiègne on June 22.

=== Renovation ===
In the 1950s the French government became concerned about a possible invasion by the Warsaw Pact through Germany. The Maginot Line, while obsolete in terms of its armament, was viewed as a series of useful deeply buried and self-sufficient shelters in an era of air power and nuclear weapons. A number of the larger ouvrages were selected to form defensive ensembles or môles around which a defence might be organised and controlled. In 1951 Molvange was planned to become part of the môle de Rochonvillers, in company with Rochonvillers and Bréhain, and later Immerhof.

=== NATO command centre ===
With France's acquisition of nuclear weapons in 1960, the Maginot fortifications began to be viewed as an expensive anachronism. Funding was provided for maintenance, but for little more. In 1960 the French Army initiated inquiries among the other French forces and among NATO members concerning the use of Maginot fortifications as storage depots or as command centres. In 1961, after discussions with the Americans and West Germans, Rochonvillers, Molvange and Soetrich were placed at the disposal of NATO. Rochonviller's main M1 magazine, with its two entries and circulation loop crossed by five galleries, was made into a wartime command centre for the 4th Allied Tactical Air Forces at a cost of 320 million francs. Molvange functioned in this role until 1967, when France withdrew from NATO's integrated command structure. 4th ATAF's command centre was relocated to Kindsbach, Germany, close to Ramstein Air Base, occupying the so-called Kindsbach Cave until 1987. The Molvange command centre is still the responsibility of the 40th Communications Regiment, based in Thionville, but has been inactive since 1999.

In 1971 the names of the Maginot ouvrages were declassified by the French military. Molvange remains the property of the French military and access is forbidden to the public. The Abri du Zeiterholz has been restored and may be visited in summer months.

== See also ==
- List of all works on Maginot Line
- Siegfried Line
- Atlantic Wall
- Czechoslovak border fortifications

== Bibliography ==
- Allcorn, William. The Maginot Line 1928-45. Oxford: Osprey Publishing, 2003. ISBN 1-84176-646-1
- Degon, André; Zylberyng, Didier, La Ligne Maginot: Guide des Forts à Visiter, Editions Ouest-France, 2014. ISBN 978-2-7373-6080-0 (in French)
- Kaufmann, J.E. and Kaufmann, H.W. Fortress France: The Maginot Line and French Defenses in World War II, Stackpole Books, 2006. ISBN 0-275-98345-5
- Kaufmann, J.E., Kaufmann, H.W., Jancovič-Potočnik, A. and Lang, P. The Maginot Line: History and Guide, Pen and Sword, 2011. ISBN 978-1-84884-068-3
- Mary, Jean-Yves; Hohnadel, Alain; Sicard, Jacques. Hommes et Ouvrages de la Ligne Maginot, Tome 1. Paris, Histoire & Collections, 2001. ISBN 2-908182-88-2 (in French)
- Mary, Jean-Yves; Hohnadel, Alain; Sicard, Jacques. Hommes et Ouvrages de la Ligne Maginot, Tome 2. Paris, Histoire & Collections, 2003. ISBN 2-908182-97-1 (in French)
- Mary, Jean-Yves; Hohnadel, Alain; Sicard, Jacques. Hommes et Ouvrages de la Ligne Maginot, Tome 3. Paris, Histoire & Collections, 2003. ISBN 2-913903-88-6 (in French)
- Mary, Jean-Yves; Hohnadel, Alain; Sicard, Jacques. Hommes et Ouvrages de la Ligne Maginot, Tome 5. Paris, Histoire & Collections, 2009. ISBN 978-2-35250-127-5 (in French)
