= Ouvrage Chesnois =

- Part of Maginot Line
- Northeast France
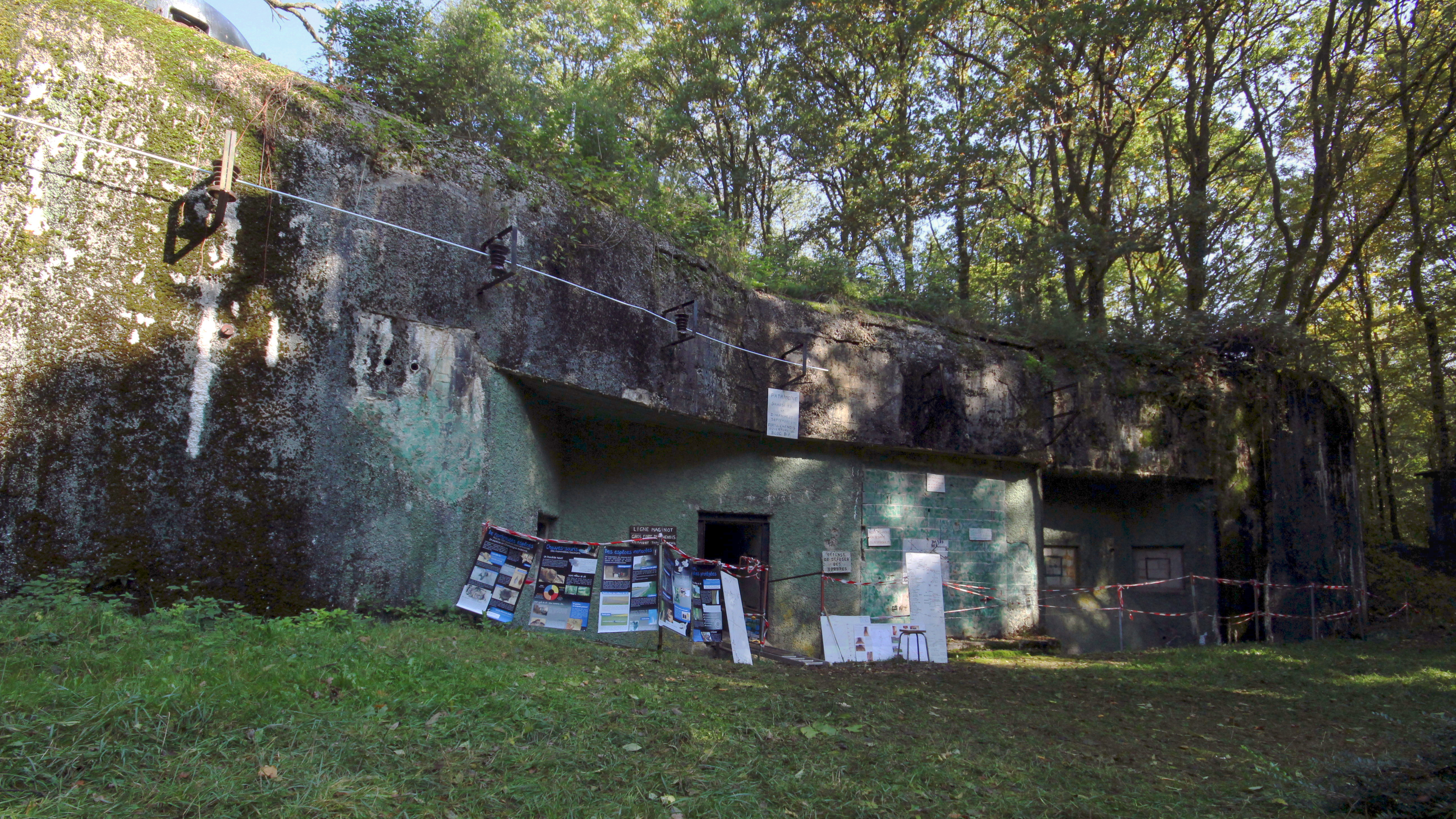
- Entrance block in 2015 with displays

Site information
- Controlled by: France
- Condition: Abandoned

Location
- Coordinates: 49.57694°N 5.33333°E

Site history
- Built by: CORF
- Materials: Concrete, steel, deep excavation
- Battles/wars: Battle of France, Lorraine Campaign

Ouvrage Chesnois (French pronunciation: [uvʁaʒ ʃɛnwa]), also known as Ouvrage Chênois, is a gros ouvrage of the Maginot Line, located in the Fortified Sector of Montmédy, facing Belgium. The ouvrage lies between the towns of Montlibert and Thonne-le-Thil. It possesses six combat blocks. It is located between gros ouvrage Thonnelle and petit ouvrage La Ferté. The position was sabotaged and abandoned by French forces that were ordered to retreat from the exposed position in June 1940 during the Battle of France. The ouvrage is now abandoned and sealed.

== Design and construction ==
The site was approved in 1934. Work by the contractor Bringer & Tondu began in 1934 at a cost of 37 million francs. A planned second phase was to add a second artillery block. The rise in tensions between France and Germany in the late 1930s prevented the second phase from being pursued.

Chesnois is one of four positions in the so-called Tête de Pont de Montmédy, a salient in the French defensive lines along the Belgian border. The isolated area was one of the "New Fronts" to the west of the main Maginot Line, created to defend against the increased threat of a German advance through Belgium. The New Front positions suffered from restricted funding, as well as discontinuity in the fortification lines. Large distances between fortifications compared to earlier portions of the Line made mutual support between ouvrages difficult.

== Description ==
Chesnois is a gros ouvrage (Note: English-language sources use the French term ouvrage as the preferred term for the Maginot positions, in preference to "fort", a term usually reserved for older fortifications with passive defensives in the form of walls and ditches. The literal translation of ouvrage in the sense of a fortification in English is "work." A gros ouvrage is a large fortification with a significant artillery component, while a petit ouvrage is smaller, with lighter arms.) It is located in gently rolling open country. The underground galleries extend more than 2,000 metres (6,600 ft) from end to end.

- Block 1: infantry block with one automatic rifle cloche (GFM-B), one GFM-B/observation cloche, one grenade launcher cloche (LG), a retractable mixed arms turret, one twin machine gun embrasure and one machine gun/47mm anti-tank gun (JM/AC47) embrasure.
- Block 2: infantry block with one GFM-B cloche and one mixed arms (AM) cloche.
- Block 3: infantry block with one GFM-B cloche, one AM cloche, one twin machine gun embrasure and one JM/AC47 embrasure.
- Block 4: infantry block with one GFM-B cloche, one GFM-B/observation cloche, one AM cloche, one twin machine gun embrasure and one JM/AC47 embrasure.
- Block 5: artillery block with one GFM-B cloche and one retractable twin 75mm gun turret.
- 'Block 6 (unbuilt)': artillery block with one GFM-B cloche and one retractable twin 75mm gun turret.
- Block 7: mixed entry block with two GFM-B cloches and one twin machine gun embrasure

The fortification's drain extends 365 metres (1,198 ft) from Block 7 and serves as an emergency exit.

A number of small blockhouses are associated with Chesnois, as well as several casemates:

- Casemate de Moiry: Double block with two JM/AC47 embrasures, two JM embrasures, two AM cloches and two GFM-B cloches.
- Casemate de Sainte-Marie: Single block with one JM/AC47 embrasure, one JM embrasure, two AM cloches and two GFM-B cloches.
- Casemate de Sapogne: Single block with one JM/AC47 embrasure, one JM embrasure, two AM cloches and one GFM-B cloche.
- Casemate de Christ: Single block with one JM/AC47 embrasure, one JM embrasure, two AM cloches and one GFM-B cloche.
- Casemate de Thonne-le-Thil: Double block with two JM/AC47 embrasures, two JM embrasures, two AM cloches and two GFM-B cloches.
- Casemate de Guerlette: Double block with two JM/AC47 embrasures, two JM embrasures, one AM cloche and two GFM-B cloches.

None of these are connected to the ouvrage or to each other.

== Manning ==
The 1940 manning of the ouvrage under the command of Captain Aubert comprised 316 men and 8 officers of the 155th Fortress Infantry Regiment. The units were under the umbrella of the 2nd Army, Army Group 1. The Casernement de Montmédy provided peacetime above-ground barracks and support services to Chesnois and other fortifications in the area.

== History ==
See Fortified Sector of Montmédy for a broader discussion of the events of 1940 in the Montmédy sector of the Maginot Line.

In the initial stages of the Battle of France, Chesnois provided covering fire to its neighbor Ouvrage La Ferté on 17–18 May 1940. Chesnois ceased fire during a French counterattack late on the 18th and did not resume firing. La Ferté's garrison was killed and the position was lost on the 19th.

In June the garrisons of the Tête de Pont de Montmédy were ordered to withdraw the night of 10–11 June to straighten French lines, and to avoid La Ferté's fate. The fortifications' arms and infrastructure were sabotaged before they were abandoned. Evacuation was complete by 12 June. The German 169th Infantry Division advanced to take possession of Chesnois and other ouvrages in the salient on 13 June 1940.

The area saw no action during the Lorraine Campaign of 1944. The interior of the ouvrage had been stripped by the Germans, and again after the war by scrap dealers.

== Current condition ==
The site is abandoned and stripped, but is sealed to access. Most surface elements remain accessible. The interior is a refuge for bats and is not accessible. It is reported to be dangerous to enter.

== See also ==
- List of all works on Maginot Line
- Siegfried Line
- Atlantic Wall
- Czechoslovak border fortifications

== Bibliography ==
- Allcorn, William. The Maginot Line 1928-45. Oxford: Osprey Publishing, 2003. ISBN 1-84176-646-1
- Kaufmann, J.E. and Kaufmann, H.W. Fortress France: The Maginot Line and French Defenses in World War II, Stackpole Books, 2006. ISBN 0-275-98345-5
- Kaufmann, J.E., Kaufmann, H.W., Jancovič-Potočnik, A. and Lang, P. The Maginot Line: History and Guide, Pen and Sword, 2011. ISBN 978-1-84884-068-3
- Mary, Jean-Yves; Hohnadel, Alain; Sicard, Jacques. Hommes et Ouvrages de la Ligne Maginot, Tome 1. Paris, Histoire & Collections, 2001. ISBN 2-908182-88-2 (in French)
- Mary, Jean-Yves; Hohnadel, Alain; Sicard, Jacques. Hommes et Ouvrages de la Ligne Maginot, Tome 2. Paris, Histoire & Collections, 2003. ISBN 2-908182-97-1 (in French)
- Mary, Jean-Yves; Hohnadel, Alain; Sicard, Jacques. Hommes et Ouvrages de la Ligne Maginot, Tome 3. Paris, Histoire & Collections, 2003. ISBN 2-913903-88-6 (in French)
- Mary, Jean-Yves; Hohnadel, Alain; Sicard, Jacques. Hommes et Ouvrages de la Ligne Maginot, Tome 5. Paris, Histoire & Collections, 2009. ISBN 978-2-35250-127-5 (in French)
