= Ouvrage Rochonvillers =

Ouvrage of the Maginot Line

- Part of Maginot Line
- Northeast France
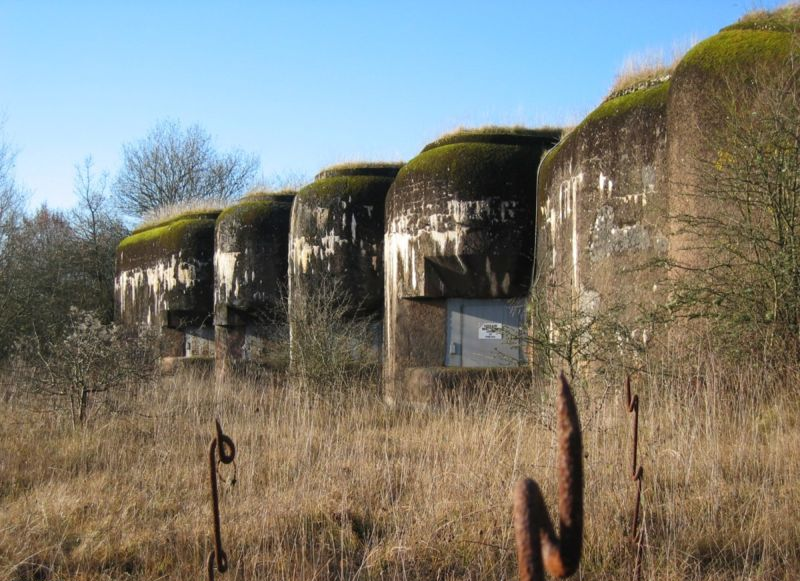
- Block 5, Gros Ouvrage 'Rochonvillers November 2004

Site information
- Controlled by: France
- Open to the public: No

Location
- Coordinates: 49.40194°N 6.0375°E

Site history
- Built: 1930-35
- Built by: CORF
- In use: Retained by French Army
- Materials: Concrete, steel, deep excavation
- Battles/wars: Battle of France, Lorraine Campaign

Ouvrage Rochonvillers is one of the largest of the Maginot Line fortifications. Located above the town of Rochonvillers in the French region of Lorraine, the gros ouvrage or large work was fully equipped and occupied in 1935 as part of the Fortified Sector of Thionville in the Moselle. It is located between the petit ouvrage d'Aumetz and the gros ouvrage Molvange, facing the border between Luxembourg and France with nine combat blocks. Rochonvillers saw little action during World War II, but due to its size it was repaired and retained in service after the war. During the Cold War it found a new use as a hardened military command centre, first for NATO and then for the French Army.

== Design and construction ==
Rochonvillers was considered an early priority for construction, and as such went through several concepts in early design while the overall concept of the Maginot Line was being investigated. It was initially proposed in 1926 as a single massive fort shielding two artillery turrets in the rear. The next concept envisioned a closely grouped arrangement of works, four peripheral units around a turreted artillery block, located somewhat to the south of the present installation. A third iteration was termed the "village", a very large and expensive concept that was opposed by the residents of Rochonvillers. The fourth version was described as a fort palmé (or palmate), based on the ideas of Colonel Tricaud, first published in the Revue du Génie in 1917. The fort palmé proposed a dispersed set of fortifications fanning out from a central subterranean trunk which would contain barracks, utilities and ammunition magazines. This concept was adopted for the entire Line, with the strong support of Marshal Philippe Pétain, in late 1927.

The Rochonvillers site was surveyed by CORF (Commission d'Organisation des Régions Fortifiées), the Maginot Line's design and construction agency, in 1929. Work by the contractor, Campernon-Bernard, began the next year, and the position became operational in 1935, at a cost of 123 million francs, the third most expensive ouvrage in the North-east.

== Description ==
Rochonvillers is located on the heights of the Aumetz plateau, giving it a command of the surrounding countryside. As a powerful position in the Line, Rochonvillers' role was to control the open country between the Moselle and the Meuse, in concert with its neighbours. The ouvrage (Note: English-language sources use the French term ouvrage as the preferred term for the Maginot positions, in preference to "fort", a term usually reserved for older fortifications with passive defenses in the form of walls and ditches. The literal translation of ouvrage in the sense of a fortification in English is "work." A gros ouvrage is a large fortification with a significant artillery component, while a petit ouvrage is smaller, with lighter arms.) formed part of the "principal line of resistance", an element of defence in depth that was preceded by a line of advance posts close to the border, and backed by a line of shelters for infantry. The gros ouvrages like Rochonvillers were so large that their fighting elements were in the line of resistance while their entrances, and hence their supply lines, were in the third line, surrounded by infantry, as much as a kilometre to the rear. The entrances were in turn served by narrow gauge (60 cm) railways that branched from a line paralleling the front and in turn connecting to supply depots. The rail lines ran straight into the munitions entry of the ouvrage and all the way out to the combat blocks, a distance of 2,250 metres (7,380 ft).

Rochonvillers covers an unusually large area. The combat blocks are connected to each other and to the subterranean barracks, magazines and entries at the rear by underground galleries at an average depth of 30 metres (98 ft). The locations of the entrances in a ravine allowed a relatively short inclined descent to the gallery complex. Stairs, ammunition hoists and chutes for spent casings rise to the surface at each block. The central utility plant or usine is just inside the personnel entry. Rochonvillers, as one of the largest ouvrages, was given a large "M1" magazine some distance from the munitions entrance, an arrangement would be useful for a command post in later years. A large barracks is located at the junction of the personnel and munitions galleries.

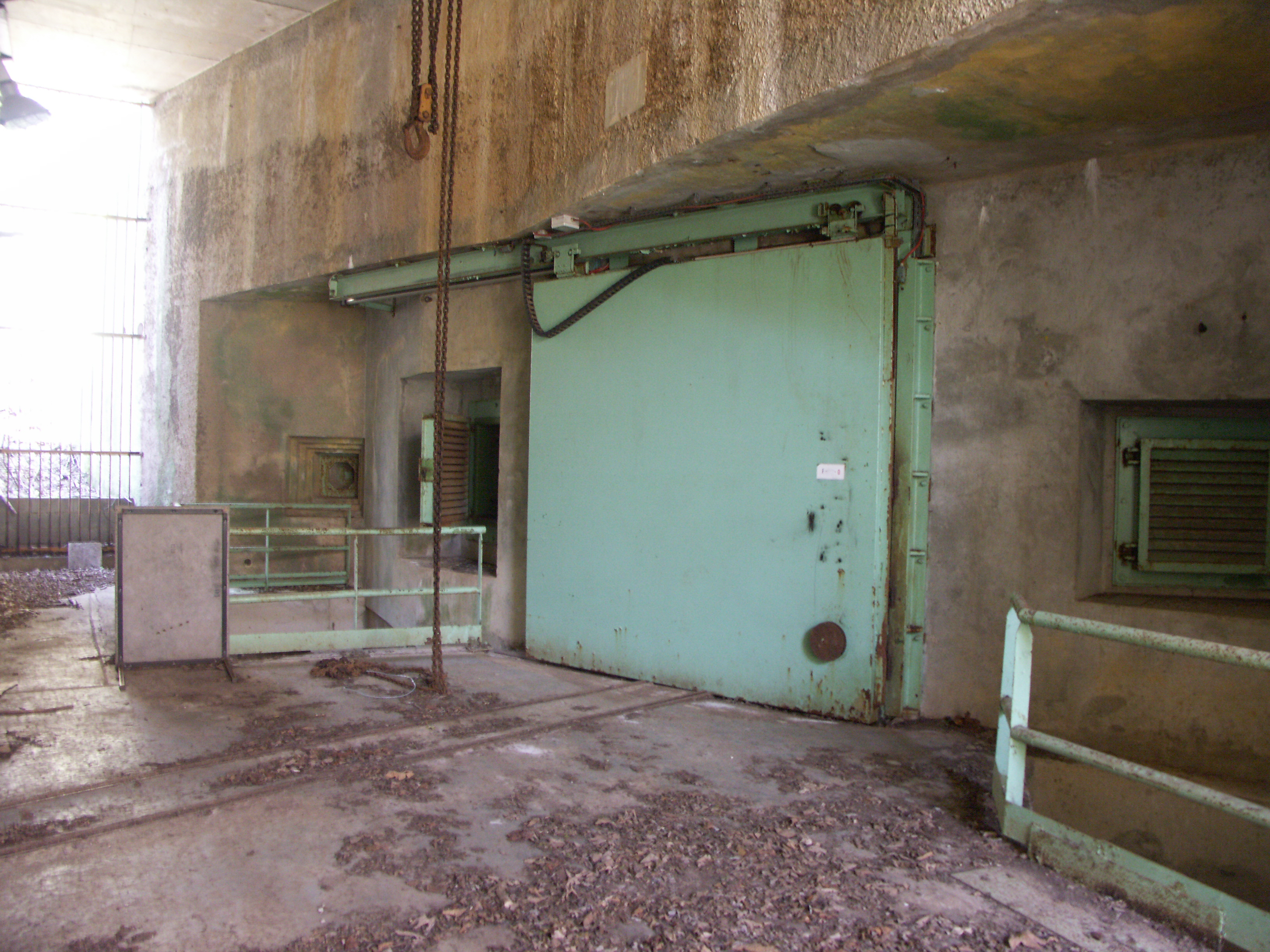
Rochonvillers munitions entry, with 60 cm rail tracks visible

- Ammunition entry: inclined plan, with the automatic rifle cloches (GFM), one machine gun/47 mm anti-tank gun embrasure (JM/AC47), modified during the 1980s.
- Personnel entry: shaft, two GFM cloches, one JM/AC47 embrasure.
- Block 1: Infantry block with one machine gun turret, one GFM cloche and one machine gun cloche (JM).
- Block 2: Artillery block with one 75 mm gun turret.
- Block 3: Artillery block with one 75 mm gun turret and two GFM cloches.
- Block 4: Observation block with one GFM cloche and one observation cloche (VDP).
- Block 5: Artillery block with three 75 mm gun embrasures, one 135 mm gun embrasure, one GFM cloche and one grenade launcher cloche (LG).
- Block 6: Artillery block with one 135 mm gun turret, one GFM cloche and one grenade launcher cloche.
- Block 7: Artillery block with one 135 mm gun turret and two GFM cloches.
- Block 8: Infantry block with one JM/AC37 embrasure, one JM machine gun embrasure, one machine gun turret and two GFM cloches.
- Block 9: Infantry block with one machine gun turret and one GFM cloche.

An emergency exit was proposed via an access gallery to the nearby Rochonvillers iron ore mine in 1934, but was not pursued. An abortive plan of 1939 proposed a connection between the Abri du Grand Lot, the Abri du Bois d'Escherange and on to gros ouvrage Molvange.

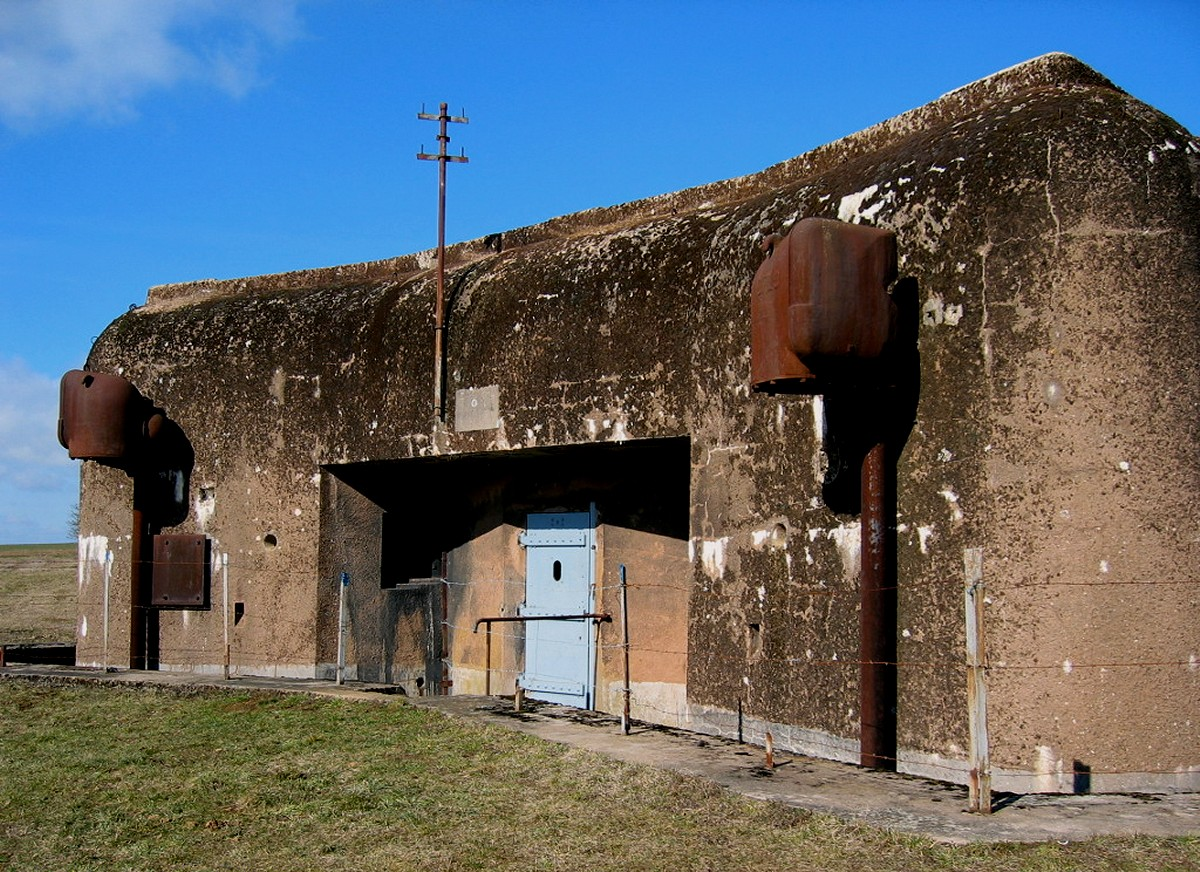
Casemate du Grand Lot in 2004

=== Casemates and shelters ===
In addition, the rear portion of the complex, near the underground barracks, is connected via a gallery to the Abri du Grand Lot (Note: An abri is an infantry shelter, sometimes underground or under earth cover. An abri in the main Maginot Line often closely resembles a casemate, but is more lightly armed and can hold more occupants.)49°24′10.9″N 06°03′55.05″E. The two-block infantry shelter (or abri) provided flanking cover to the Rochonvillers entrances, located in a wooded ravine out of sight from the main ouvrage, and covered the space between Rochonvillers and Molvange. It was armed with two GFM cloches. The Casemate du Grand Lot is nearby on higher ground 49°24′28.13″N 06°03′45.65″E, but not connected to the gallery system. The casemate was armed with two JM/AC47 embrasures, two heavy twin machine gun embrasures, and two GFM cloches. Both were built by CORF.

A series of casemates and infantry shelters extend in an arc in the direction of Molvange, including

- Casemate d'Escherange Ouest: Single block with one JM/AC47 embrasure, one JM embrasure, and two GFM cloches.
- Casemate d'Escherange Est: Single block with one JM/AC47 embrasure, one JM embrasure, and one GFM cloche.
- Casemate du Petersberg Ouest: Single block with one JM/AC47 embrasure, one JM embrasure, and two GFM cloches.
- Casemate du Petersberg Est: One mortar cloche, one GFM cloche.
- Abri Bois d'Escherange: Shelter for two infantry sections, two GFM cloches.

None of these are connected to the ouvrage or to each other.

The Observatiore du Réservoir, located near Ouvrage Bréhain, reported to Rochonvillers.

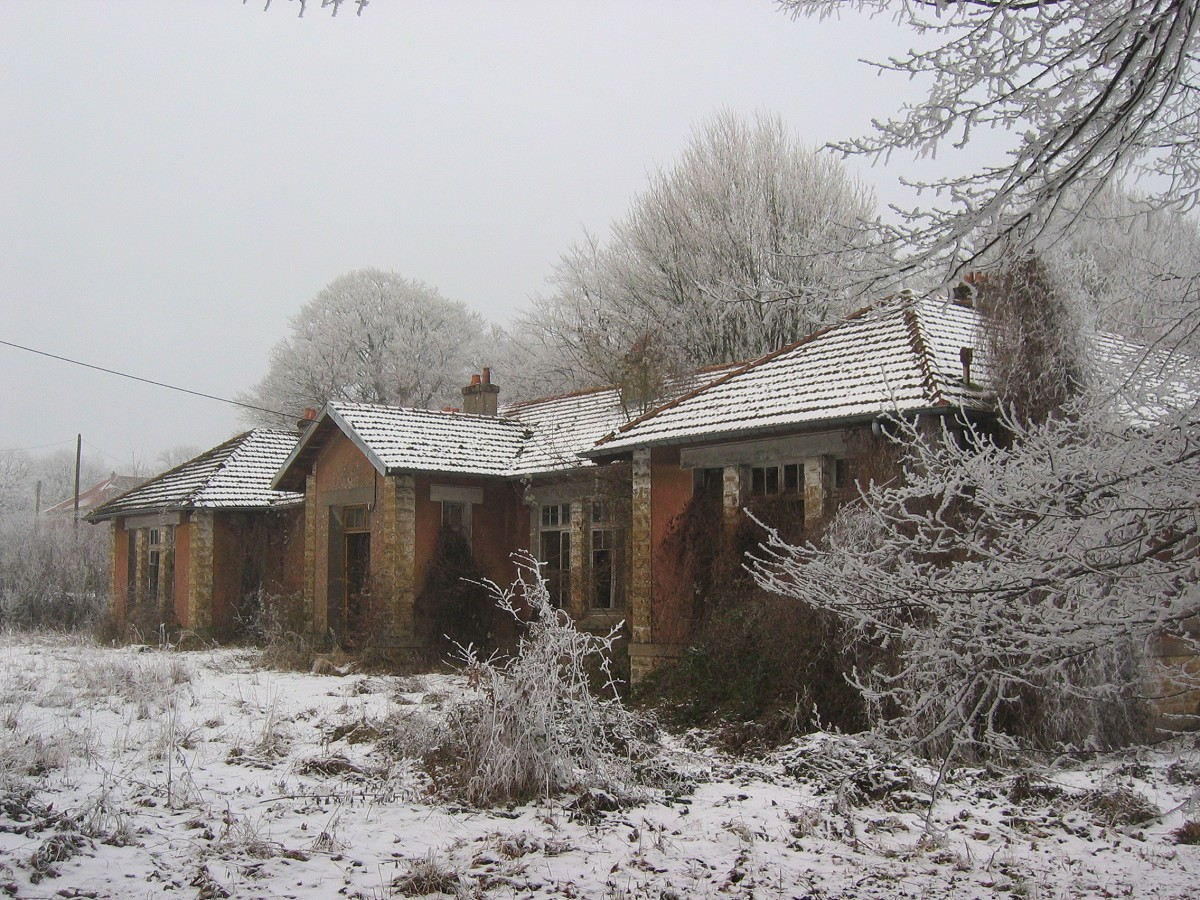
Camp d'Angevillers

== Manning ==
The 1940 manning of the ouvrage under the command of Commandant Guillemain comprised 756 men and 26 officers of the 169th Fortress Infantry Regiment and the 151st Position Artillery Regiment. The units were under the umbrella of the 42nd Fortress Corps of the Third Army, Army Group 2.

Peacetime quarters for the garrisons of Rochonvillers and Molvange were at the Camp d'Angevillers, just to the south of the Rochonvillers entries, near the town of Angevillers. With the establishment of the CENTAG wartime headquarters at Rochonvillers, the French 125th Régiment d'Instruction des Transmissions and the 2nd Régiment du Génie occupied the camp, along with the 175th Signal Company and the 208th Signal Support Company of the US Army. US Air Force units occupied portions of Molvange, which housed the Fourth Allied Tactical Air Force wartime headquarters. The camp was later occupied by the 40th Régiment de Transmissions stationed at the Jeanne d'Arc barracks in Thionville and the Guyon-Gellin barracks in Hettange-Grande, near the Ouvrage Immerhof.

== History ==
See Fortified Sector of Thionville for a broader discussion of the events of 1940 in the Thionville sector of the Maginot Line.

Rochonvillers did not see significant action in the Battle of France in 1940, nor in the Lorraine Campaign of 1944. The Germans in 1940 largely bypassed the area, advancing along the valley of the Meuse and Saar rivers, threatening the rear of the Thionville sector. An order to fortress troops by sector commander Colonel Jean-Patrice O'Sullivan to prepare for withdrawal on 17 June was reversed by O'Sullivan. On 21 June a 75 mm gun in Block 5 exploded, killing one gunner and seriously wounding another. The gun position has never been repaired. Rochonvillers was bombarded by heavy artillery on 22 June, with a projectile penetrating and exploding in Block 5. On June 30, 1940, the troops of the 169th RIF were ordered to evacuate their positions by the French command, seven days after the 22 June 1940 armistice.

The occupying Germans used Rochonvillers' barracks and magazine areas as troop quarters. After its occupation by the Americans in 1944, the Americans used some of the turrets and cloches in blocks 5, 6 and 7 for experiments with armour-piercing weapons, in preparation for their assault on the Siegfried Line.

=== Anlage Brunhilde ===
A concrete building near the entrance blocks is known as the Anlage Brunhilde, a lightly reinforced building that was built by the Luftwaffe in 1940. It has been described as a Fuehrer Bunker, but there is no indication that Hitler ever visited the site. An alternative name is FHQ Zigeuner.:

=== Renovation ===
In the 1950s the French government became concerned about a possible invasion by the Warsaw Pact through Germany. A number of the larger ouvrages were selected to form defensive ensembles or môles around which a defence might be organised and controlled. Rochonvillers was chosen in 1951 to become the centre of the môle de Rochonvillers, in company with Molvange and Bréhain, and later Immerhof. Block 5 was re-equipped with 105 mm and 135 mm guns and 12.7 mm machine guns, while the 135 mm turret of Block 6 was repaired with parts from the turret of Four-à-Chaux. Repairs to waterproofing and tunnel lining were undertaken at this time. By 1956 the ouvrage was restored to its original state, apart from the renovations to blocks 5 and 6.

=== NATO command centre ===
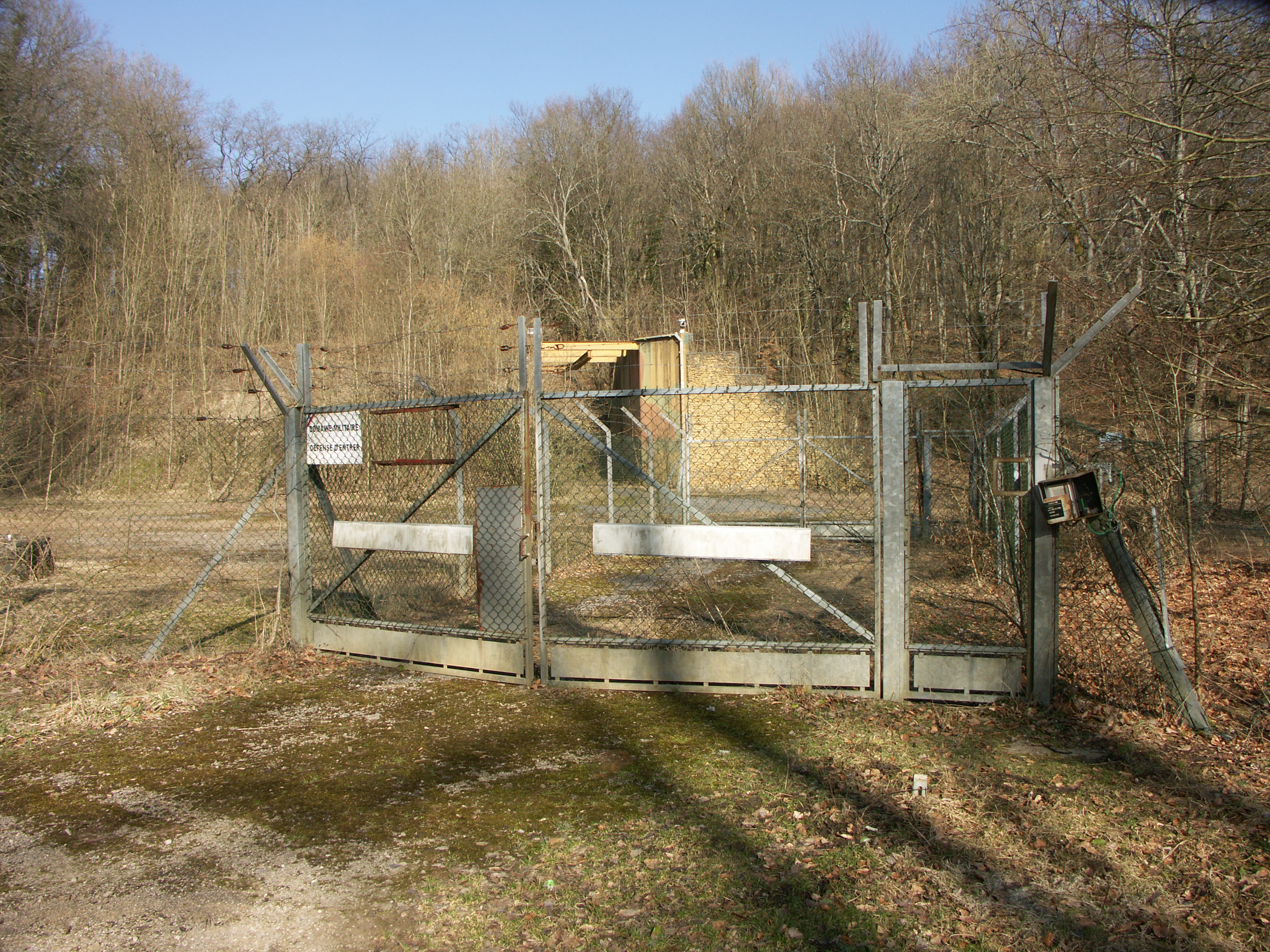
Munitions entry and perimeter fence in 2011

With France's acquisition of nuclear weapons in 1960, the Maginot fortifications began to be viewed as an expensive anachronism. Funding was provided for maintenance, but for little more. The Maginot Line, while obsolete in terms of its armament, was viewed as a series of useful deeply buried and self-sufficient shelters in an era of air power and nuclear weapons. In 1960 the French Army initiated inquiries among the other French forces and among NATO members concerning the use of Maginot fortifications as storage depots or as command centres. In 1961, after discussions with the Americans and West Germans, Rochonvillers, Molvange and Soetrich were placed at the disposal of NATO. Rochonviller's main magazine, with its two entries and circulation loop crossed by five galleries, was made into a wartime command centre for the NATO Central Army Group (CENTAG) (normally located at Fontainebleau) at a cost of 380 million francs. Rochonvillers functioned in this role until 1967, when France withdrew from NATO's integrated command structure. The command centre is located close to and between the personnel entry and the munitions entry, with connections to each. It is more than a kilometre from the command centre to the main combat blocks via the main underground gallery.

CENTAG's headquarters were moved to Brunssum, the Netherlands, where the deactivated Hendrik coal mine was available for use. In 1971 the names of the Maginot ouvrages were declassified by the French military. At the same time, Rochonvillers was demoted from a fortified position of the first rank to a lower status, foreshadowing a general divestment of the Maginot Line's function as a fortification.

=== French Army command centre ===
After deactivation in 1967, Rochonvillers was renovated in 1980 as the French First Army's hardened command centre. Work included replacement of the ventilation and filtration system and construction of a blast wall a short distance in front of the main entry. The installation was planned to house 500 people for an extended period, immune to the effects of electromagnetic pulse, radioactivity, chemical weapons and all but a direct hit with a nuclear weapon. The electrical generating plant and underground barracks were renovated. Most exposed concrete faces in the entry blocks were covered with earth as a blast shield, while the combat blocks themselves were used only as antenna mounts. The peacetime 1st Army headquarters was moved from Strasbourg to Metz in 1989, in part to be closer to Rochonvillers. From 1981 to 1998, the command centre was maintained by a small staff in between full-scale exercises. With the disappearance of the Soviet threat, the command centre was deactivated.

The Camp d'Angevillers is the above-ground component associated with the command centre, located to the north-east of Angevillers. The entries to the ouvrage and the command centre are located just to the north-east of the camp, with more than a kilometre of galleries connecting to the combat blocks on the hill above Rochonvillers.

== Current condition ==
The ouvrage remains under the control of the French Army, but is no longer occupied. The combat blocks are sealed from the command centre and abandoned. Access to the site is forbidden. The Casemate du Grand Lot is not within the security zone and is occasionally open for visits, with all of its equipment on display.

== See also ==
- List of all works on Maginot Line
- Siegfried Line
- Atlantic Wall
- Czechoslovak border fortifications

== Bibliography ==
- Allcorn, William. The Maginot Line 1928-45. Oxford: Osprey Publishing, 2003. ISBN 1-84176-646-1
- Kaufmann, J.E. and Kaufmann, H.W. Fortress France: The Maginot Line and French Defenses in World War II, Stackpole Books, 2006. ISBN 0-275-98345-5
- Kaufmann, J.E., Kaufmann, H.W., Jancovič-Potočnik, A. and Lang, P. The Maginot Line: History and Guide, Pen and Sword, 2011. ISBN 978-1-84884-068-3
- Mary, Jean-Yves; Hohnadel, Alain; Sicard, Jacques. Hommes et Ouvrages de la Ligne Maginot, Tome 1. Paris, Histoire & Collections, 2001. ISBN 2-908182-88-2 (in French)
- Mary, Jean-Yves; Hohnadel, Alain; Sicard, Jacques. Hommes et Ouvrages de la Ligne Maginot, Tome 2. Paris, Histoire & Collections, 2003. ISBN 2-908182-97-1 (in French)
- Mary, Jean-Yves; Hohnadel, Alain; Sicard, Jacques. Hommes et Ouvrages de la Ligne Maginot, Tome 3. Paris, Histoire & Collections, 2003. ISBN 2-913903-88-6 (in French)
- Mary, Jean-Yves; Hohnadel, Alain; Sicard, Jacques. Hommes et Ouvrages de la Ligne Maginot, Tome 5. Paris, Histoire & Collections, 2009. ISBN 978-2-35250-127-5 (in French)
