= Ouvrage Thonnelle =

- Part of Maginot Line
- Northeast France
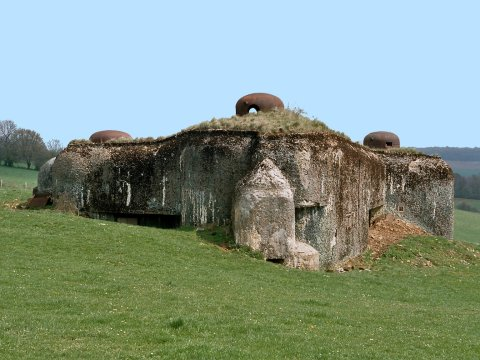
- Ouvrage Thonnelle, Block 1

Site information
- Controlled by: France
- Condition: Abandoned

Location
- Coordinates: 49.55°N 5.39167°E

Site history
- Built by: CORF
- Materials: Concrete, steel, deep excavation
- Battles/wars: Battle of France, Lorraine Campaign

Ouvrage Thonnelle is a petit ouvrage of the Maginot Line, located in the Fortified Sector of Montmédy between the towns of Thonnelle and Verneuil-Petit, facing Belgium. It possesses four combat blocks. It is located between gros ouvrages Vélosnes and Chesnois. The position was sabotaged and abandoned by French forces that were ordered to retreat from the exposed position in June 1940 during the Battle of France. The ouvrage is abandoned.

== Design and construction ==
The site was approved in 1934. Work by the contractor GTBA began in 1935 at a cost of 23.7 million francs. A planned second phase was to add one artillery block and support facilities, while a third phase was to add three artillery blocks, making Thonnelle a gros ouvrage. The rise in tensions between France and Germany in the late 1930s prevented the second and third phases from being pursued.

Thonnelle is one of four positions in the so-called Tête du Pont de Montmédy, a salient in the French defensive lines along the Belgian border. The isolated area was one of the "New Fronts" to the west of the main Maginot Line, created to defend against the increased threat of a German advance through Belgium. The New Front positions suffered from restricted funding, as well as discontinuity in the fortification lines. Large distances between fortifications compared to earlier portions of the Line made mutual support between ouvrages difficult.

== Description ==
Thonnelle is a large petit ouvrage (Note: English-language sources use the French term ouvrage as the preferred term for the Maginot positions, in preference to "fort", a term usually reserved for older fortifications with passive defensives in the form of walls and ditches. The literal translation of ouvrage in the sense of a fortification in English is "work." A gros ouvrage is a large fortification with a significant artillery component, while a petit ouvrage is smaller, with lighter arms.) It is located at the crest of a hogback ridge, with Block 4 in the steep northern slope, Block 2 at the crest and Block 3 in the gentler southward slope.

- Block 1: infantry block with one automatic rifle cloche (GFM-B), one mixed-arms cloche (AM), one twin machine gun embrasure and one machine gun/47mm anti-tank gun (JM/AC47) embrasure.
- Block 2: infantry block with one GFM-B cloche and two AM cloches
- Block 3: entry block with one GFM-B cloche, one GFM/observation cloche, one AM cloche, one grenade launcher cloche and two automatic rifle embrasures.
- Block 4: infantry block with two GFM-B cloches, one twin retractable machine gun turret, one twin machine gun embrasure and one JM/AC47 embrasure.

The unbuilt portions of the ouvrage were projected to include an artillery block with a twin 75mm gun turret, a combination ammunition/personnel entrance block and an expanded utility and barracks space, linked to the first phase by a long gallery. The third phase was planned to add another 75mm gun turret, an 81mm mortar turret and a twin 135mm gun turret.

A number of small blockhouses are associated with Thonnelle, as well as three casemates:

- Casemate d'Avoith: Single block with one JM/AC47 embrasure, one JM embrasure, two AM cloches and one GFM-B cloche.
- Casemate de Fresnois: Double block with two JM/AC47 embrasures, two JM embrasures, one AM cloche and two GFM-B cloches.
- Casemate de Saint-Antoine: Single block with two JM/AC47 embrasures, one JM embrasure, two AM cloches and one GFM-B cloche.

None of these are connected to the ouvrage or to each other.

== Manning ==
The 1940 manning of the ouvrage under the command of Captain Gatellier comprised 186 men and 3 officers of the 155th Fortress Infantry Regiment. The units were under the umbrella of the 2nd Army, Army Group 1. The Casernement de Montmédy provided peacetime above-ground barracks and support services to Thonnelle and other fortifications in the area.

== History ==
See Fortified Sector of Montmédy for a broader discussion of the events of 1940 in the Montmédy sector of the Maginot Line.

During the Battle of France the garrisons of the Tête de Pont de Montmédy were ordered to withdraw the night of 10–11 June 1940 to straighten French lines. The fortifications' arms and infrastructure were sabotaged before they were abandoned. Evacuation was complete by 12 June. The German 169th Infantry Division advanced to take possession of Thonnelle and other ouvrages in the salient on 13 June 1940. The nearby Ouvrage La Ferté was less fortunate. It had already been taken by the Germans, its entire garrison killed, on 20 May. The fate of La Ferté influenced the decision to evacuate the remaining three positions.

The area saw no action during the Lorraine Campaign of 1944. The interior of the ouvrage had been stripped by the Germans, and again after the war by scrap dealers.

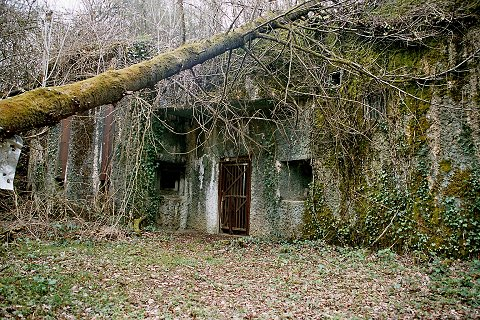
Block 3

== Current condition ==
The site is abandoned, stripped, and open to the elements. It is reported to be partly flooded and dangerous to enter.

== See also ==
- List of all works on Maginot Line
- Siegfried Line
- Atlantic Wall
- Czechoslovak border fortifications

== Bibliography ==
- Allcorn, William. The Maginot Line 1928-45. Oxford: Osprey Publishing, 2003. ISBN 1-84176-646-1
- Kaufmann, J.E. and Kaufmann, H.W. Fortress France: The Maginot Line and French Defenses in World War II, Stackpole Books, 2006. ISBN 0-275-98345-5
- Kaufmann, J.E., Kaufmann, H.W., Jancovič-Potočnik, A. and Lang, P. The Maginot Line: History and Guide, Pen and Sword, 2011. ISBN 978-1-84884-068-3
- Mary, Jean-Yves; Hohnadel, Alain; Sicard, Jacques. Hommes et Ouvrages de la Ligne Maginot, Tome 1. Paris, Histoire & Collections, 2001. ISBN 2-908182-88-2 (in French)
- Mary, Jean-Yves; Hohnadel, Alain; Sicard, Jacques. Hommes et Ouvrages de la Ligne Maginot, Tome 2. Paris, Histoire & Collections, 2003. ISBN 2-908182-97-1 (in French)
- Mary, Jean-Yves; Hohnadel, Alain; Sicard, Jacques. Hommes et Ouvrages de la Ligne Maginot, Tome 3. Paris, Histoire & Collections, 2003. ISBN 2-913903-88-6 (in French)
- Mary, Jean-Yves; Hohnadel, Alain; Sicard, Jacques. Hommes et Ouvrages de la Ligne Maginot, Tome 5. Paris, Histoire & Collections, 2009. ISBN 978-2-35250-127-5 (in French)
