= Fortified Sector of Montmédy =

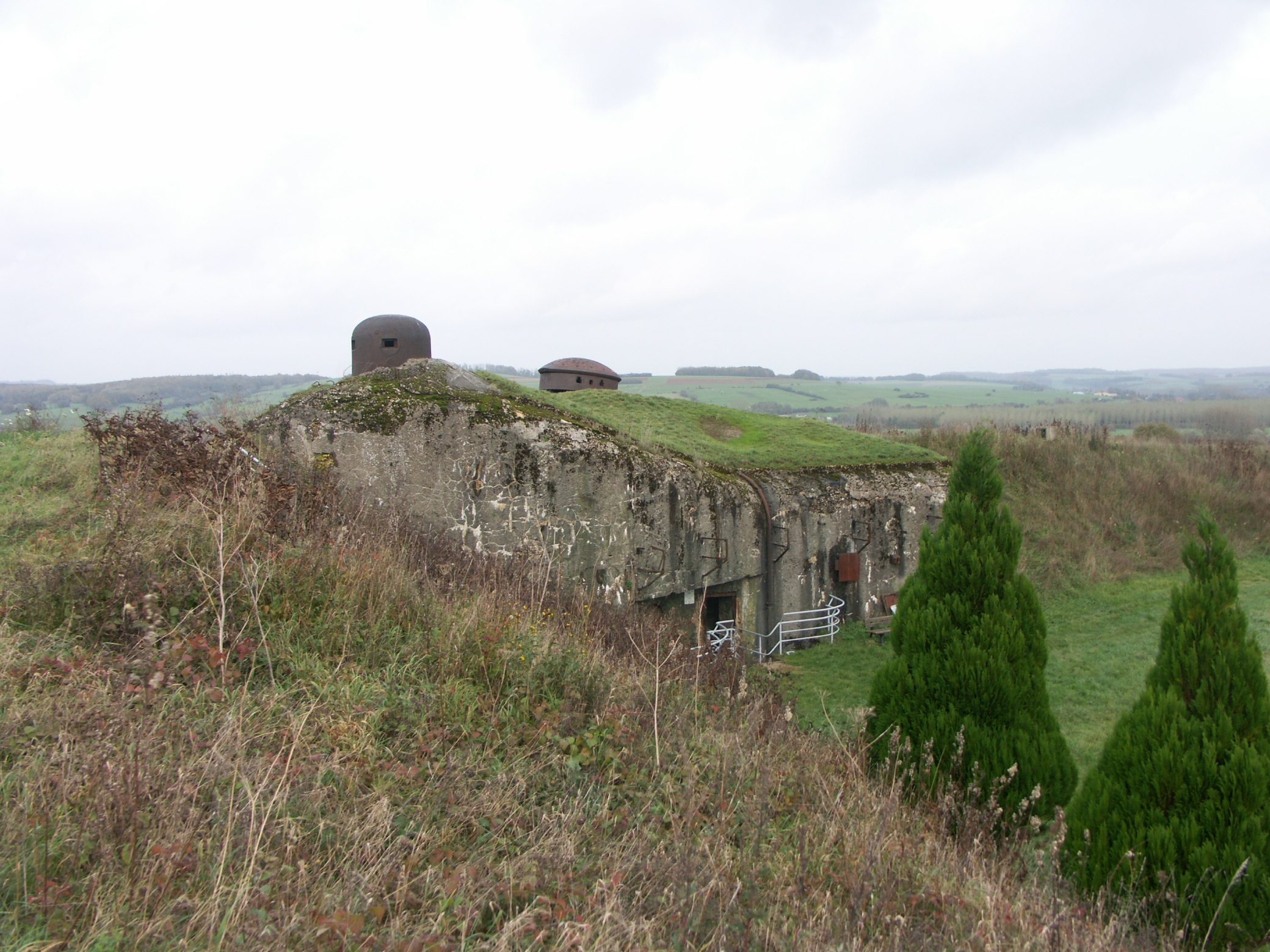
Block 2, La Ferté

The Fortified Sector of Montmédy (Secteur Fortifié de Montmédy) was the French military organisation that in 1940 controlled the section of the Maginot Line between Sedan and Longuyon, a distance of about 60 kilometres (37 mi). The sector was not as strongly defended as other sections of the Maginot Line, facing the southern Ardennes region of Belgium. Large portions of the Montmédy sector were defended by fortified houses, blockhouses or casemates. The sector includes only four ouvrages of the type found in stronger sections of the Line. The weakly defended area in front of Sedan was the scene of a major breakthrough by German forces in the opening of the Battle of France. This was followed by a German assault on the Maginot Ouvrage La Ferté, which killed the entire garrison, the only such event on the Maginot Line.

== Concept and organisation ==
The sector was created in 1940 as part of the reorganisation of the Meuse Front, which was combined with the Maginot Montmédy Bridgehead (Tête du Pont de Montmédy) and the Defensive Sector of Marville, itself separated from the Fortified Sector of the Crusnes. As a result, the fortifications in the new sector represent a wide variety of types and degrees of fortification. The Sedan subsector comprises two distinct lines, with fortified houses close to the border and a line of blockhouses along the line of the Meuse. The houses were built in 1938 by the Military Works organisation (Main d'Oeuvre Militaire (MOM)), while the blockhouses were built primarily by the Army Engineer Service (Service Technique du Génie (STG)), beginning in 1936. The Mouzon subsector was organised similarly. A number of blockhouses were built to local designs, such as the FCR or Billotte blocks of the Sedan subsector.

The fortified houses took the form of a blockhouse on the ground floor with a light residential superstructure providing living quarters for the crew manning the blockhouse. Their armament consisted principally of light arms fired from a number of firing ports and embrasures, augmented by light anti-tank weapons. Fortified houses were sited close to the frontier, typically in a location that commanded the cross-border road. Blockhouses were plain concrete structures, providing little to nothing in the way of living quarters for their crews. Blockhouses typically displayed the rounded edges and shielded firing positions characteristic of artillery casemates and combat blocks of the Maginot ouvrages built by CORF (Commission d'Organisation des Régions Fortifiées), the Maginot Line's design and construction agency, but were usually built under non-CORF direction. Casemates tended to be built by CORF as part of the integrated Maginot defences, and frequently mounted heavier weapons, of up to 75 mm calibre. Both casemates and blockhouses could have infantry cloches or cupolas for observation and protected small-arms fire.

Yet another organisation was the Commission of Study for Fortified Zones (Commission d'Études des Zones Fortifiées (CEZF)), which planned and built blockhouses along the valley of the Meuse and the Chiers in the Sedan and Mouzon subsectors in 1940, known as the Second Position.

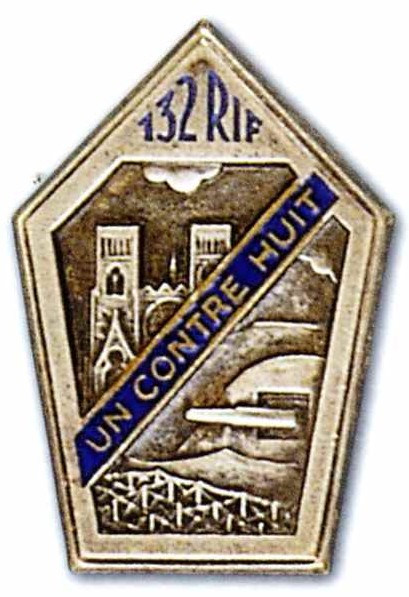
Insignia of the 132nd RIF.

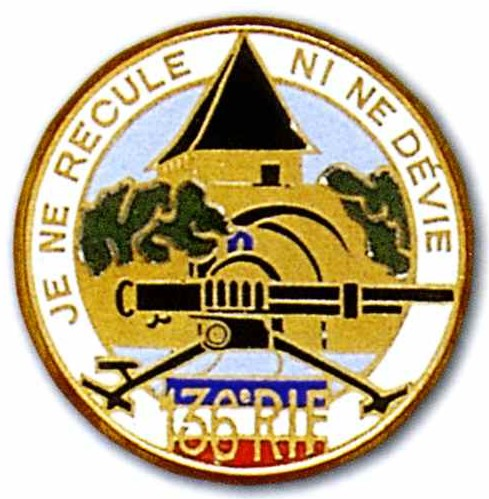
Insignia of the 136th RIF.

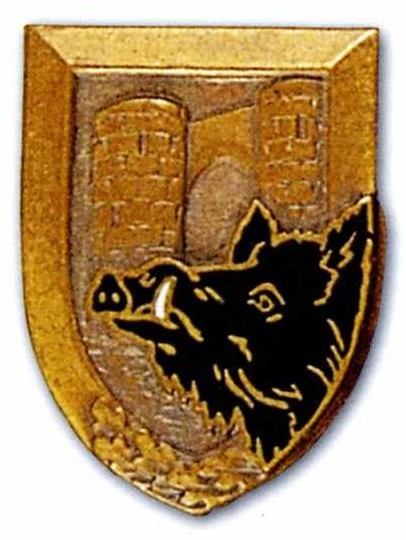
Insignia of the 147th RIF.

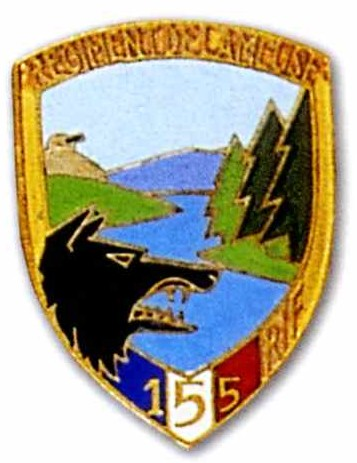
Insignia of the 155th RIF.

== Command ==
The Montmédy sector was under the overall command of the French 2nd Army, under the command of General Charles Huntziger, which was in turn part of Army Group 2 under General André-Gaston Prételat. The SF Montmédy was commanded by General Burtaire, then General Renondeau from 27 May 1940. The command post was at the Château des Tilleuls at Stenay. The interval troops, the army formations that were to provide the mobile defence for the sector, to support and be supported by the fixed defences, were under the command of the 10th Corps (10e Corps d'Armee), General Grandsart, commander, and the 18th Corps (18e Corps d'Armee), General Rochard, commander. The 10th Corps was in turn made up of the 55th Infantry Division and the 3rd North African Division (3e Division d'Infanterie Nord-Africaine (DINA)). The 18th Corps was composed of the 41st Infantry Division and the 3rd Colonial Division (3e Division d'Infanterie Coloniale (DIC)). Artillery support for the sector was provided by the 1st Regiment of the 169th Position Artillery Regiment (Régiment d'Artillerie de Position (RAP)), which controlled both fixed and mobile artillery, commanded by Chef d'Escadron Perry. The 41st ID and 3rd DIC were made up of Class A reservists, while the 55th ID was a Class B reserve formation, not considered suitable for significant combat. The 3rd DINA was an active-duty formation.

At the midpoint of the Battle of France on 1 June 1940, the fortress troops of the SF Montmédy amounted to four fortress infantry regiments in 13 battalions.

== Description ==
The sector included, in order from west to east, the following major fortified positions, together with the most significant casemates and infantry shelters in each sub-sector: (Note: English-language sources use the French term ouvrage as the preferred term for the Maginot positions, in preference to "fort", a term usually reserved for older fortifications with passive defenses in the form of walls and ditches. The literal translation of ouvrage in the sense of a fortification in English is "work." A gros ouvrage is a large fortification with a significant artillery component, while a petit ouvrage is smaller, with lighter arms.)

=== Subsector of Sedan ===
147th Fortress Infantry Regiment (147e Régiment d'Infanterie de Forteresse (RIF)), Colonel Pinard, with the 55th DI as interval troops

The Sedan sub-sector was not considered part of the Maginot fortifications, as they were built by organizations other than CORF and were planned as largely local initiatives, rather than as an integrated chain of advanced, mutually supportive fortifications.

Line of fortified houses (MOM), 1938:

- Maison Forte K (la Grève), MF8
- Maison Forte de Montimont, MF9
- Maison Forte du Bois-de-Saint-Menges, MF10
- Maison Forte de la Hatrelle, MF11
- Maison Forte Q (Illy or Olly), MF12
- Maison Forte de la Maison Friquet, MF13
- Maison Forte du Bouchon-de-la-Grenouille, MF14
- Maison Forte du Bouchon-Louisval, MF15

Principal line of resistance (FCR/STG), 1936:

- Blockhaus du Grand-Condé
- Blockhaus de Paquis-des-Cailles
- Blockhaus de la Fosse-Colin-Noizet
- Casemate des Vaux-Dessus, STG casemate for a 75mm gun
- Blockhaus de Bellevue
- Blockhaus de Pépinière-Crepelet
- Blockhaus du Côte-du-Pré-de-Meuse
- Blockhaus des Longuees-Orgières

58 infantry shelters or abris, 1936–1939.

Additionally, a series of 11 Bilotte-style blockhouses were built as the "Second Position" stop line behind Sedan

=== Subsector of Mouzon ===
136th Fortress Infantry Regiment (136e Régiment d'Infanterie de Forteresse (RIF)), Lt. Colonel Vinson, with the 3rd DINA as interval troops

The Mouzon subsector was not considered part of the Maginot fortifications. However, a gros ouvrage was originally proposed for the sub-sector, the Ouvrage de Vaux-les-Mouzon.

Line of fortified houses (MOM), 1938:

- Maison Forte de Beau-Terma (or Termes), MF16
- Maison Forte du Bouchon-des-Sarts, MF17
- Maison Forte du Bois-de-Pure, MF18
- Maison Forte de la Douane, MF19
- Maison Forte du Bouchon-des-Rappes, MF20
- Maison Forte de Mogues, MF21
- Maison Forte de la Croix-du-Routy, MF22

Principal line of resistance (FCR/STG), Chiers line, 1936-1940:

- Blockhaus de Palletto
- Blockhaus de Grand-Pâquis, STG casemate for a 75mm gun
- Blockhaus de Petit-Remilly
- Blockhaus de Brévilly-Ouest
- Blockhaus de Brévilly
- Blockhaus de la Prix-du-Loup
- Blockhaus de Chyberchamp, STG casemate for a 75mm gun
- Blockhaus de Bruncent
- Blockhaus de Tétaigne A
- Blockhaus de Tétaigne
- Blockhaus de Tratilly
- Blockhaus de l'Épinette
- Blockhaus d'Euilly, STG casemate for a 75mm gun
- Blockhaus de la Chaussée
- Blockhaus de Toutay Nord
- Blockhaus de Tourtay Sud
- Blockhaus de la Mahotte
- Blockhaus de la Prairie-de-Blanchampagne
- Blockhaus de Sailly
- Blockhaus de la Fond-Dur

104 infantry shelters or abris, 1936–1939.

Second Lines: A "stop line with 11 Bilotte-style blockhouses were built as the "Second Position" or "Meuse barrier" behind Charleville. A similar group of 14 abris formed the Meuse line/CEZF Line behind Montmédy.

=== Subsector of the Tête de Pont de Montmédy (Montmédy Bridgehead) ===
155th Fortress Infantry Regiment (155e Régiment d'Infanterie de Forteresse (RIF)), Lt Colonel Culot, with the 3rd DIC as interval troops

- Ouvrage La Ferté, petit ouvrage of two combat blocks
- Ouvrage Chesnois, gros ouvrage of seven combat blocks
- Ouvrage Thonnelle, petit ouvrage of four combat blocks and two entry blocks
- Ouvrage Velosnes, gros ouvrage of six combat blocks
- Casemate de Margut
- Casemate de Villey Ouest (adjacent to La Ferté)
- Casemate de Villey Est (adjacent to La Ferté)
- Casemate de Moiry
- Casemate de Sainte-Marie
- Ouvrage de Sapogne, petit ouvrage, only one block built as the Casemate de Sapogne below
- Casemate de Sapogne
- Casemate de Christ
- Casemate de Thonne-le-Thil
- Casemate de Guerlette
- Casemate d'Avioth
- Casemate de Fresnois
- Casemate de Saint-Antoine
- Casemate d'Ecouviez Ouest
- Casemate d'Ecouviez Est

Second line: Nine blockhouses (FCR/STG) and two casemates, the Casemate de la Laiterie and the Casemate de Villecloye to the rear of the Maginot Line. The casemates each mounted a single 75mm gun.ouvrages.

Peacetime barracks and support:

- Casernement de la Ferté (never built)
- Casernement de Montmédy

=== Subsector of Marville ===
132nd Fortress Infantry Regiment (132e Régiment d'Infanterie de Forteresse (RIF)), Lt. Colonel Blanchet, with the 41st DI as interval troops, command post at Grand-Failly. The Marville sector was a separate sector, the Defensive Sector of Marville, until March 1940.

- Chiers Line: 11 blockhouses along the Chiers Valley (FCR/STG).
- Principal Line of Resistance: 10 blockhouses and one casemate (FCR/STG)
- Mangiennes-Pierrepont CEZF reinforcing line: four STG blockhouses

== History ==
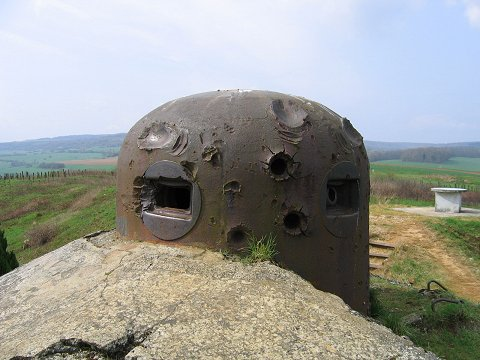
GFM cloche with combat damage, La Ferté

=== Battle of France ===
On 13 May 1940, the German Army Group A attacked the French 2nd Army in the vicinity of Sedan and Monthermé. The attack came as a surprise to the French forces of the Sedan subsector. The French 55th Infantry Division, a second-line reserve formation, had spent most of its time constructing blockhouses along the line of the Meuse and Chiers rivers, with priority going to the Chiers line. When the German attack came, it found the 55th ID unprepared for combat, and its blockhouses along the Meuse, the focus of the German attack, were incomplete and unarmed. The attack by the German 1st, 2nd and 10th Panzer Divisions was preceded by a heavy aerial bombardment, which, while ineffective at causing casualties or damage to fortifications, effectively destroyed the division's will to resist. German infantry advances late on the 13th produced a disorganised retreat, and by the 14th the Germans had broken through the French defences.

As the French forces in the Sedan subsector fled, the Chiers line in the Mouzon subsector was exposed. Ordered by General Huntziger to retreat to new positions farther south, the end of the Montmédy Bridgehead became exposed. This was composed of the village of Villy, occupied by the 3rd Colonial Infantry Division, backed up by Ouvrage La Ferté, the effective western end of the Maginot Line. The Germans immediately moved to attack La Ferté (known to the Germans as Panzerwerke 505) with the 71st Infantry Division. La Ferté, as part of the Maginot Line, was designed to be supported by its neighbours when under attack. Lacking a neighbour to the west, it had to depend on Ouvrage Chesnois for artillery support. However, the Maginot fortifications in the area were farther apart than in other sectors, and La Ferté was at the limit of Chesnois' artillery range. La Ferté was itself lightly armed, although it had been augmented with two artillery casemates armed with 75 mm guns. These casemates, however, were not connected as part of the position's integrated defences, lacking a secure underground connection to the main position.

By 15 May the Germans were preparing an attack on Villy and La Ferté. On the 17th the Germans seized Hills 226 and 311, which commanded the ouvrage and were used as firing positions for artillery. The Villy artillery casemates were evacuated by the French the same day. On the 18th Villy village was occupied by the Germans, despite determined French resistance from a series of fortified houses in the village. La Ferté was encircled. On 18 May the Germans moved closer to the ouvrage, employing direct fire with four 88 mm guns. The exposed cloches and turrets became untenable, severely reducing the ouvrage's ability to resist the assault. A French counterattack failed. With the upper levels of both blocks on fire, resistance ceased on the 19th. Germans with respirators entered on the 20th and determined that the garrison was dead, killed by carbon monoxide poisoning.

In June the remaining garrisons of the Tête de Pont de Montmédy were ordered to withdraw the night of 10–11 June to straighten French lines, and to avoid La Ferté's fate. The fortifications' arms and infrastructure were sabotaged before they were abandoned. Evacuation was complete by 12 June, a day ahead of the scheduled withdrawal, which resulted in the uncovering of the west flank of Ouvrage Ferme Chappy to the east. The German 169th Infantry Division advanced to take possession of the salient on 13 June 1940.

The Germans stripped the Montmédy fortifications during the Occupation, removing weapons for re-use and salvaging the massive steel cloches for scrap. While Maginot fortifications in other sectors were restored for further use during the Cold War, the SF Montmédy was not reactivated.

==== Units ====
The 132nd Fortress Infantry Regiment was shifted from the SF Crusnes to the SF Montmédy on 16 March 1940, holding the Chiers line. As part of a general withdrawal of French forces from the Maginot Line, the 132nd RIF pulled back on 13 June and joined the Division de marche Burtaire, retreating to Verdun. The regiment was assigned to hold the Fort Douaumont on 14 May. On the 15th the regiment was ordered to continue retreating in the direction of Toul. It was eventually captured to the south of Toul in the area of Colombey-les-Belles and Goviller between 20 and 22 June.

The 136th Fortress Infantry Regiment covered the Mouzon subsector. The sector came under air attack from 10 May 1940, with infantry attack from 12 May. On the 14th the regiment moved back to the Inor belt of fortifications. On 21 May the 6th company was captured by German forces in the Hache Forest and the Inor line was abandoned, falling back to Stenay. As the unit fell back, it organised anti-tank barricades along the route. The 9th company was captured at Azannes on 14 June. The 136th was at Crepey on 25 June for the armistice.

The 147th Fortress Infantry Regiment was stationed on the Sedan subsector. The regiment came under attack from 13 May and was pushed back to the Fort du Rozelier near Verdun by 21 May, when it was attached to the 71st Infantry Division, which became the 17trh ID two days later. Reorganised as the 59th Light Infantry Regiment on 5 June, the regiment fall back to Arc-en-Barrois.

The 155th Fortress Infantry Regiment held the Tête du Pont de Montmédy, the most exposed portion of the sector, including La Ferté. The regiment was engaged from 13 May, and retreating to the Inor area after the loss of La Ferté and its garrison on 19 May. The units sabotaged their positions and retreated on 12 June. They were attached to the division de marche Burtaire, falling back to the Verdun and Saint-Mihiel area. After briefly freeing Gironville, the regiment was captured on 20–22 June near Toul.

== Present status ==
La Ferté is a French war memorial, with a small cemetery nearby. The other three ouvrages are abandoned although the surface of Vélosnes is maintained as a nature trail; its interior is a protected refuge for bats. Casemates and blockhouses may still be found throughout the sector, but none are specifically protected or restored.

== Bibliography ==
- Allcorn, William. The Maginot Line 1928-45. Oxford: Osprey Publishing, 2003. ISBN 1-84176-646-1
- Kaufmann, J.E. and Kaufmann, H.W. Fortress France: The Maginot Line and French Defenses in World War II, Stackpole Books, 2006. ISBN 0-275-98345-5
- Kaufmann, J.E., Kaufmann, H.W., Jancovič-Potočnik, A. and Lang, P. The Maginot Line: History and Guide, Pen and Sword, 2011. ISBN 978-1-84884-068-3
- Mary, Jean-Yves; Hohnadel, Alain; Sicard, Jacques. Hommes et Ouvrages de la Ligne Maginot, Tome 1. Paris, Histoire & Collections, 2001. ISBN 2-908182-88-2 (in French)
- Mary, Jean-Yves; Hohnadel, Alain; Sicard, Jacques. Hommes et Ouvrages de la Ligne Maginot, Tome 3. Paris, Histoire & Collections, 2003. ISBN 2-913903-88-6 (in French)
- Mary, Jean-Yves; Hohnadel, Alain; Sicard, Jacques. Hommes et Ouvrages de la Ligne Maginot, Tome 5. Paris, Histoire & Collections, 2009. ISBN 978-2-35250-127-5 (in French)
- Romanych, Marc; Rupp, Martin. Maginot Line 1940: Battles on the French Frontier. Oxford: Osprey Publishing, 2010. ISBN 1-84176-646-1
