= Hettange-Grande =

- Commune
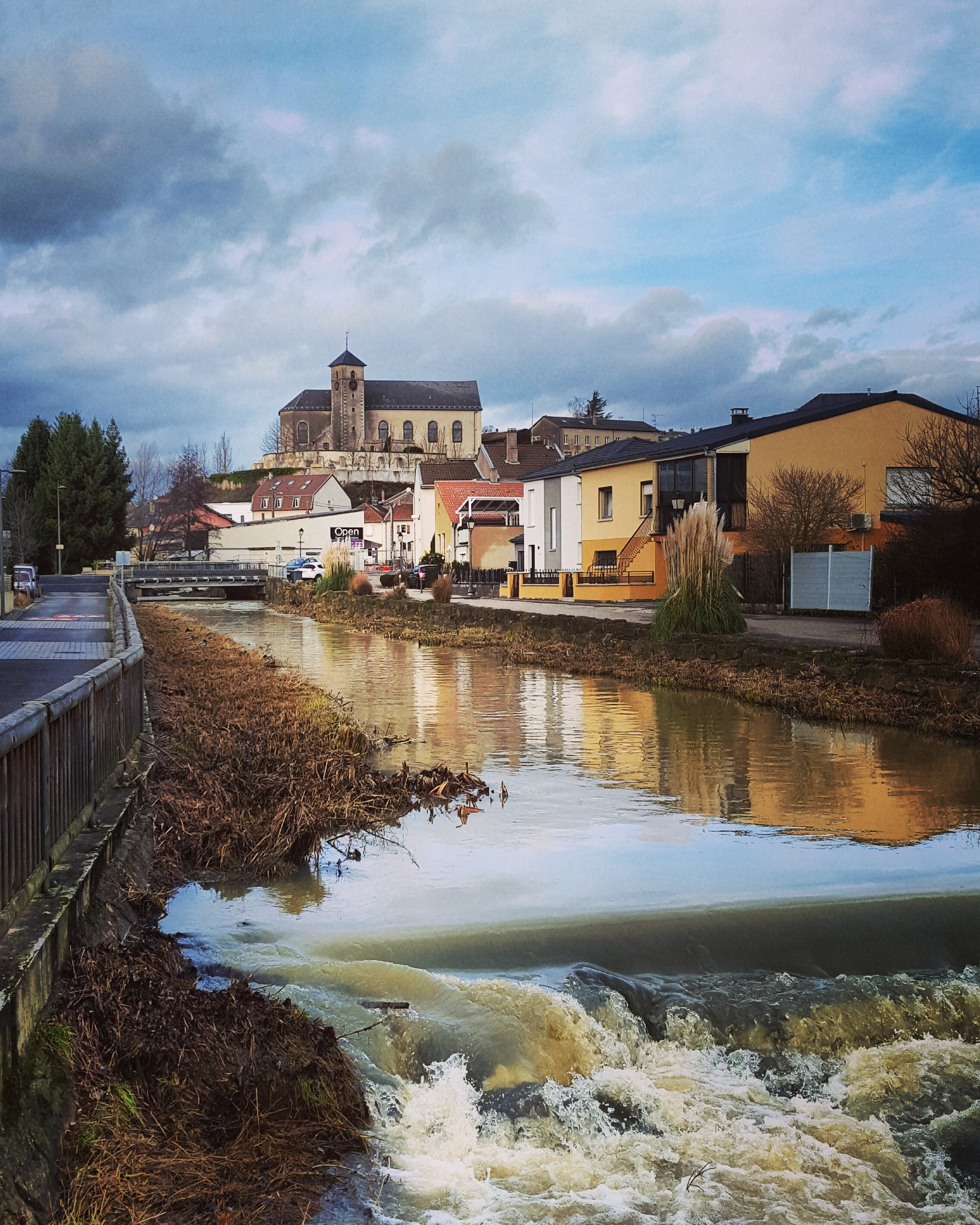
- The Church, located on the hill known as "Le Rocher" in central Hettange-Grande, seen from the river Kissel

- Coat of arms
- Location of Hettange-Grande
- Location within France Location within Grand Est
- Coordinates: 49°24′24″N 6°09′14″E
- Country: France
- Region: Grand Est
- Department: Moselle
- Arrondissement: Thionville
- Canton: Yutz

Government
  - Mayor (2020–2026): Roland Balcerzak
- Area^{1}: 16.27 km^{2} (6.28 sq mi)
- Highest elevation: 247 m (810 ft)
- Lowest elevation: 155 m (509 ft)
- Population (2023): 7,772
  - Density: 477.7/km^{2} (1,237/sq mi)
- Time zone: UTC+01:00 (CET)
  - Summer (DST): UTC+02:00 (CEST)
- INSEE/Postal code: 57323 /57330
- ^{1} French Land Register data, which excludes lakes, ponds, glaciers > 1 km^{2} (0.386 sq mi or 247 acres) and river estuaries.

Hettange-Grande (French pronunciation: [ɛtɑ̃ʒ ɡʁɑ̃d]; German: Großhettingen; Lorraine Franconian: Grouss-Hetténgen) is a commune in the Moselle department in Grand Est in north-eastern France.

The town gives its name to the Hettangian age, the earliest age of the Jurassic period of the geologic timescale.

== Geography ==
Hettange-Grande is located close to the borders between Belgium, France, Germany, and Luxembourg.

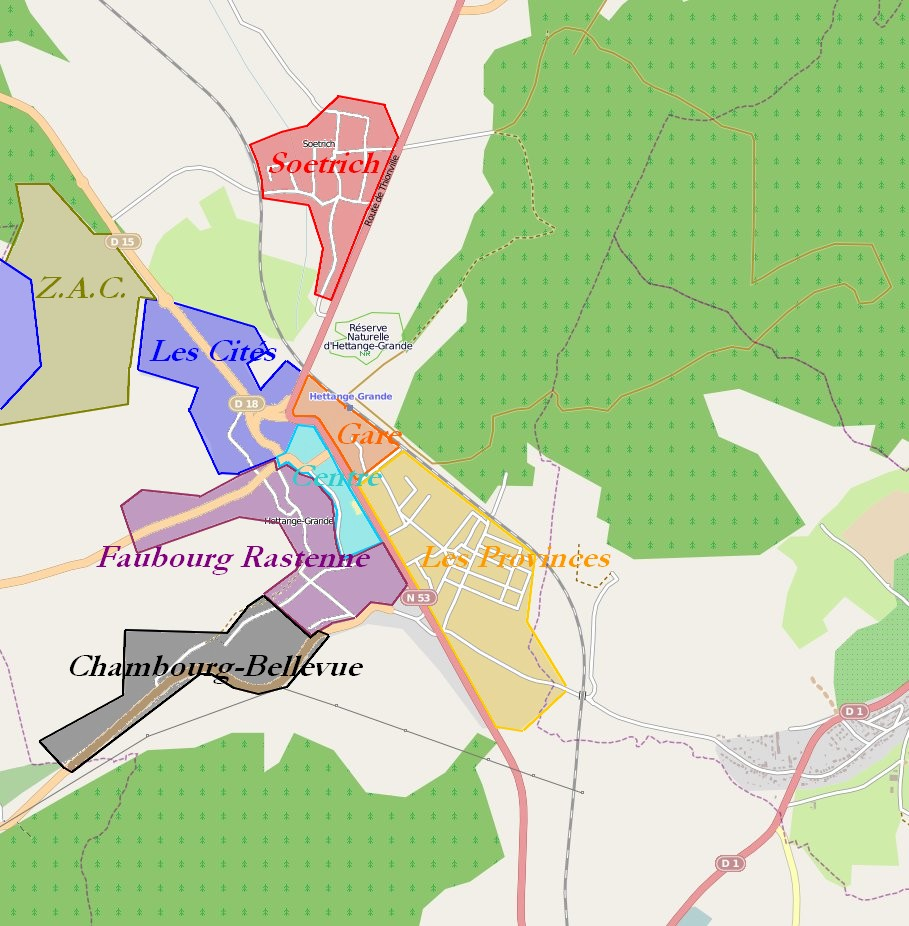
Quarters of Hettange-Grande

=== Transportation ===
The commune is located on the A31 autoroute (also called the Lorraine-Bourgogne autoroute) which links the Burgundy region with Luxembourg. Departmental road 653, which runs from Thionville to Frisange (Luxembourg), crosses the town centre.

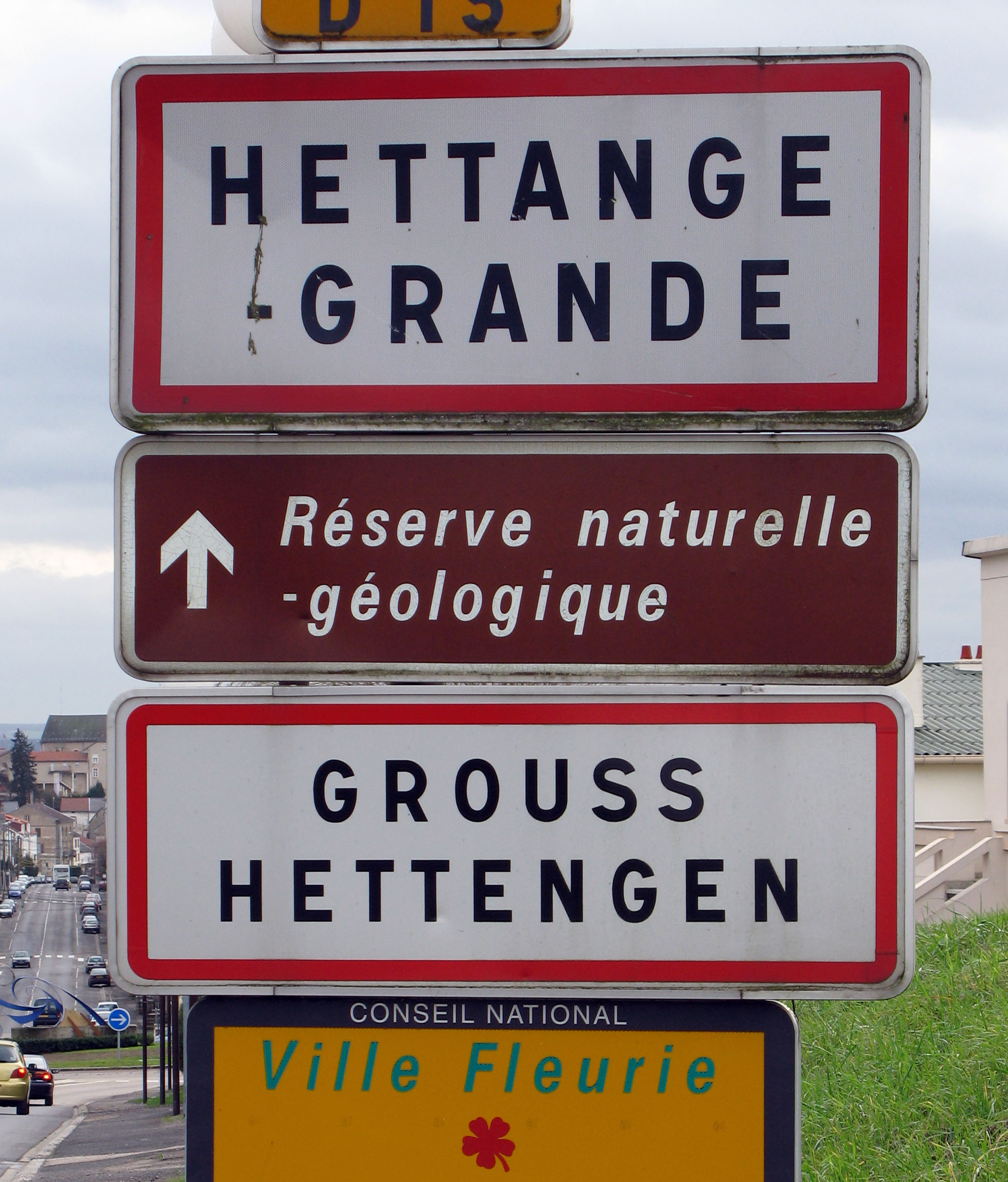
Bilingual road sign

== History ==
Hettange-Grande was part of the Duchy of Luxembourg until the 1659 Treaty of the Pyrenees, when it was ceded to France during the first Partition of Luxembourg, along with the nearby town of Thionville.

== Population ==
Historical population
Year	Pop.	±% p.a.
1968	5,037	—
1975	5,621	+1.58%
1982	5,786	+0.41%
1990	5,734	−0.11%
1999	6,356	+1.15%
2007	7,422	+1.96%
2012	7,566	+0.39%
2017	7,653	+0.23%
2023	7,772	+0.26%
Source: INSEE

== Twin towns ==
Hettange-Grande is twinned with:

- Sinzig, Germany, since 1966,
- Pederobba, Italy, since 1977

== See also ==
- Communes of the Moselle department
