= AC 47 anti-tank gun =

AC 47
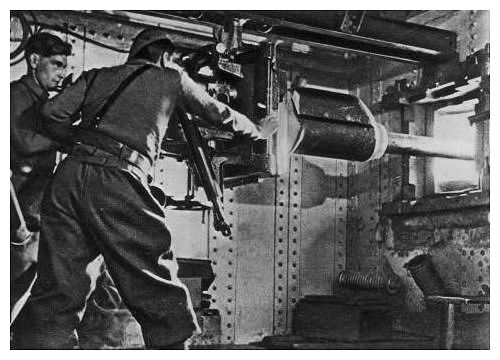
- AC 47 of Block 1, Ouvrage Schoenenbourg in 1940
- Type: Anti-tank
- Place of origin: France

Service history
- In service: 1930s–1940s
- Used by: France
- Wars: World War II

Production history
- Variants: Naval

Specifications
- Caliber: 47 mm (1.85 in)
- Rate of fire: 20 rounds per minute
- Muzzle velocity: 900 metres per second (3,000 ft/s)

The AC 47 was a French anti-tank gun of 47 mm calibre. It was principally used in the ouvrages and casemates of the Maginot Line in the late 1930s; another version was created for naval use. AC stands for anti-char, char being French for "tank".

The AC 47 was principally used as a defensive weapon, since its portability was intentionally limited to prevent the weapon from being turned on defending troops if a fortification was captured.

== Characteristics ==
- Length of the tube : 2.52 m (8.26 ft) L/50
- Rifling: 16, right-handed
- Penetration: At an incidence of 30° it could penetrate 77 mm of armour at 500 metres and 56 mm at 1000 metres.

== See also ==
- 47 mm APX anti-tank gun
