= Ouvrage Fermont =

- Part of Maginot Line
- Northeast France
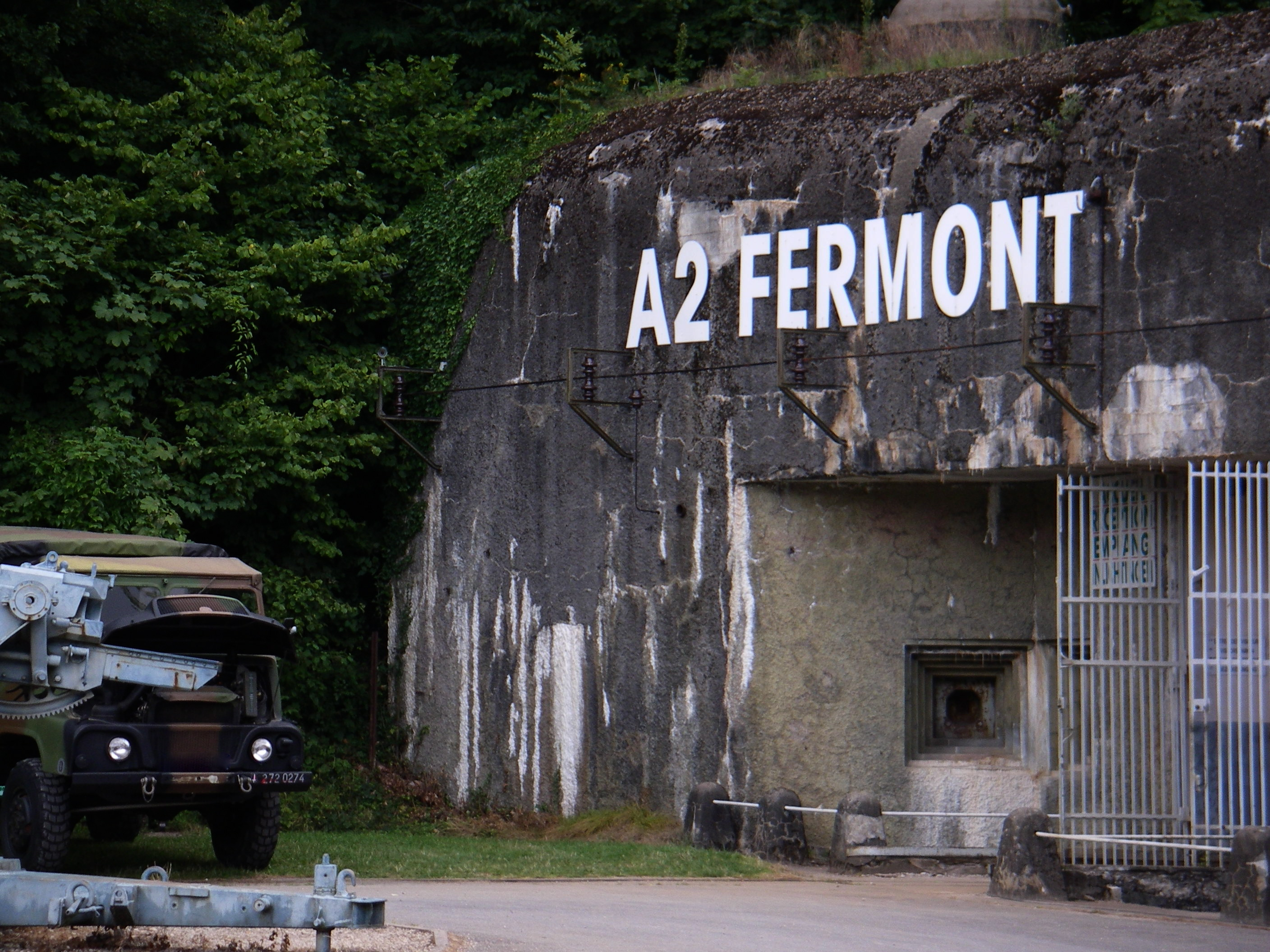

Site information
- Controlled by: France
- Open to the public: Yes
- Condition: Preserved

Location
- Location within France
- Coordinates: 49.45624°N 5.66157°E

Site history
- Built by: CORF
- Materials: Concrete, steel, deep excavation
- Battles/wars: Battle of France, Lorraine Campaign

Ouvrage Fermont is a gros ouvrage of the Maginot Line, part of the Fortified Sector of the Crusnes in northeastern France, near the community of Montigny-sur-Chiers. It is located near the commune of Montigny-sur-Chiers, between the petit ouvrage Ferme Chappy and the gros ouvrage Latiremont. The position is near the western end of the Line, about four kilometers east of Longuyon, facing Belgium. There was significant combat at Fermont during the last stages of the Battle of France. It was repaired and reactivated during the 1950s and 1960s as a strongpoint in the event of an invasion by Soviet forces. After being abandoned by the military, it has been restored and is maintained as a museum.

== Design and construction ==
The site was surveyed by the Commission d'Organisation des Régions Fortifiées (CORF), the Maginot Line's design and construction agency, in early 1931. Fermont was approved for construction in May 1931. It was completed at a cost of 77 million francs by the contractor Allary of Paris. While the existing ouvrage is a fully realized gros ouvrage (Note: English-language sources use the French term ouvrage as the preferred term for the Maginot positions, in preference to "fort", a term usually reserved for older fortifications with passive defensives in the form of walls and ditches. The literal translation of ouvrage in the sense of a fortification in English is "work." A gros ouvrage is a large fortification with a significant artillery component, while a petit ouvrage is smaller, with lighter arms.) of the typical fort palmé ("palm-shaped") form, a second phase, never executed, was planned to add four more combat blocks. The fort palmé is a distributed fortification, with its entrances and underground support areas more than a kilometer to the rear, connected to the combat blocks by a long underground gallery. The "palm" is composed of the grouped combat blocks, linked by galleries to the main trunk.

== Description ==
Fermont comprises two entrance blocks, three infantry blocks, three artillery blocks, and one observation block. The combat blocks are connected to the entries and support areas by a gallery system extending over 1,000 metres (3,300 ft) from end to end. The munitions and personnel entries are located far to the rear of the compactly arranged combat blocks, with the entries hidden in the woods. Both entry blocks required elevators to reach the level of the gallery, as the preferred inclined or level tunnel could not be achieved in the local topography. A partial "M1" ammunition magazine is located just inside the ammunition entry, while the underground barracks are located near the junction of the two entry galleries. From there a long, straight gallery runs at an average depth of 30 metres (98 ft) to the combat blocks. Fermont was served by a 60 cm-gauge narrow-gauge railway, which enters at the munitions entrance and runs all the way out through the galleries to the combat blocks. On the surface, the railway connects to supply points to the rear and to other ouvrages.

- Block 1: artillery block with one retractable turret for two 75 mm guns, one grenade launcher cloche and one light machine gun cloche.
- Block 2: infantry block with one retractable turret for two machine guns and one light machine gun cloche.
- Block 3: observation block with one observation cloche, one light machine gun cloche and two retractable machine gun turrets.
- Block 4: artillery block with three embrasures for 75 mm guns, one retractable machine gun turret and one light machine gun cloche.
- Block 5: artillery block with one retractable turret for two 81 mm mortars and one light machine gun cloche.
- Block 6: infantry block with one retractable turret for two machine guns and one retractable 81 mm mortar turret.
- Block 7: infantry block with one twin heavy machine gun embrasure, one machine gun/47mm anti-tank gun embrasure (JM/AC47), one grenade launcher cloche and one light machine gun cloche.
- Personnel entry: one JM/AC47 embrasure, one light machine gun embrasure and two light machine gun cloches.
- Ammunition entry: one JM/AC47 embrasure, two light machine gun embrasures, one grenade launcher cloche and two light machine gun cloches.

Unbuilt blocks:

- Block 8 (unbuilt): artillery block with one retractable turret for two 75 mm guns and one light machine gun cloche.
- Block 9 (unbuilt): artillery block with one retractable turret for two 135 mm guns, one grenade launcher cloche and one light machine gun cloche.
- Block 10 (unbuilt): infantry block with two twin heavy machine gun embrasures, JM/AC47 embrasure and two light machine gun cloches. The block was to be located well in advance of the main combat blocks.
- Block 11 (unbuilt): infantry block with two twin heavy machine gun embrasures, two JM/AC47 embrasures, two heavy twin machine gun cloches and two light machine gun cloches.

The additional blocks were planned for the late 1930s, but were not built as resources were diverted elsewhere. The M1 magazine was to be doubled in size at the same time.

=== Casemates and shelters ===
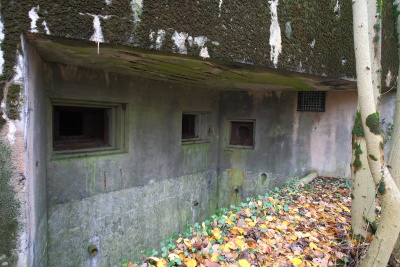
The Beuveille casemate

A series of detached casemates and observation points surround Fermont, including the:

- Casemate de Puxieux: Single block with one JM/AC47 embrasure, one JM embrasure and two GFM cloches
- Observatoire de Puxieux: One VP observation cloche, one mortar cloche and one GFM cloche, reporting to Fermont.
- Casemate du Bois-de-Beuveille: Single block with one JM/AC47 embrasure, one JM embrasure, one mortar cloche and one GFM cloche. The casemate is close to the main ouvrage entrances, on the far side of the hill.
- Observatiore de l'Haut-de-l'Anguille: One VP observation cloche and one GFM cloche, reporting to Fermont.

None of these are connected to the ouvrage or to each other. The Caserne Lamy provided peacetime above-ground barracks and support services to Fermont and other fortifications in the area.

== Manning ==
The 1940 manning of the ouvrage under the command of Captain Aubert comprised 553 men and 19 officers of the 149th Fortress Infantry Regiment and the 152nd Position Artillery Regiment. The units were under the umbrella of the 42nd Fortress Corps of the 3rd Army, Army Group 2.

== History ==
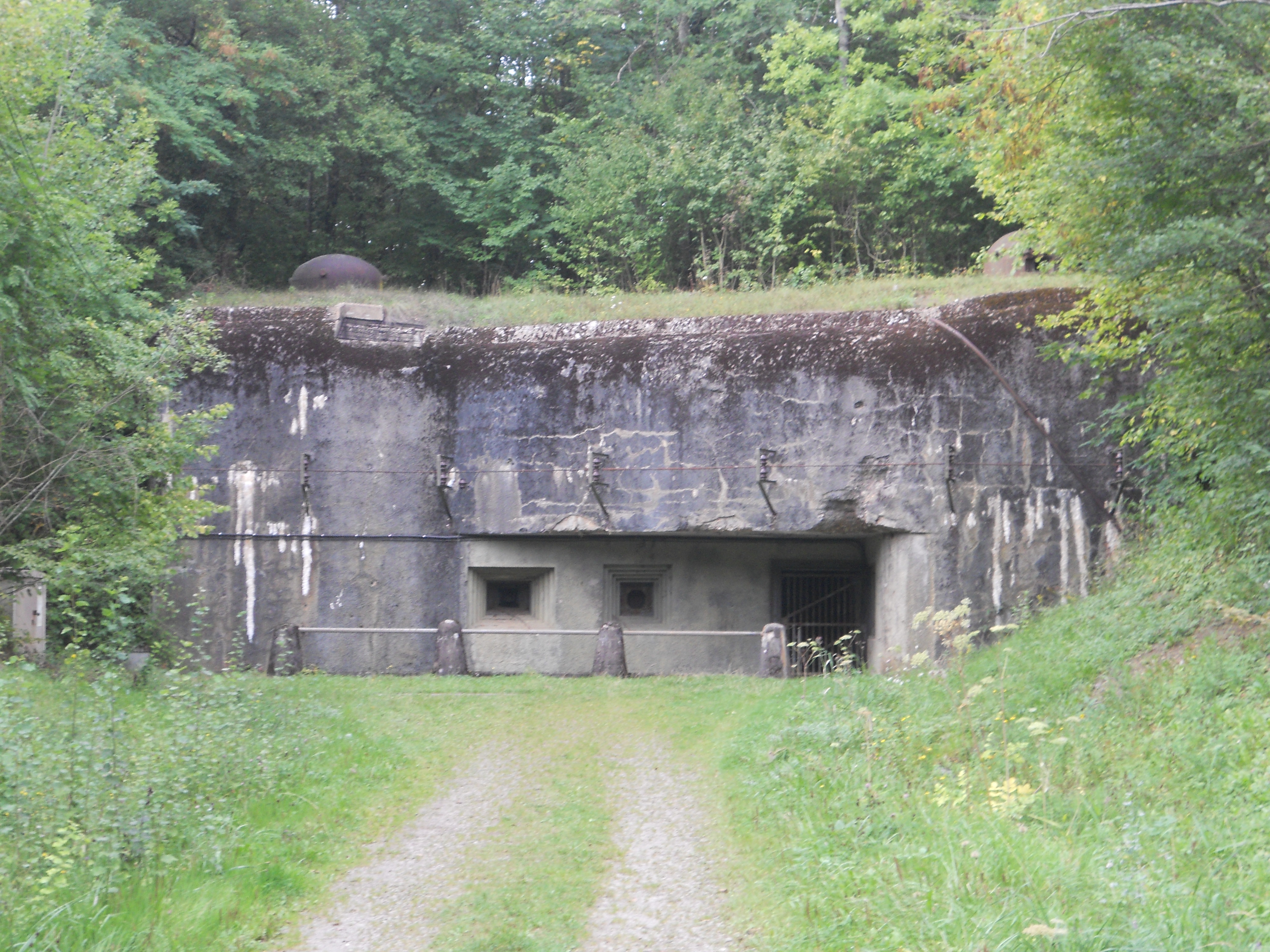
Personnel entry

See Fortified Sector of the Crusnes for a broader discussion of the events of 1940 in the Crusnes sector of the Maginot Line.

At the opening of the Battle of France in May 1940 Fermont exchanged gunfire with the Wehrmacht. On 11 May Fermont's 75 mm turret opened fire on the German 17th Infantry Division. On the 13th, Fermont provided covering fire for French forces retreating from Longwy, which was between the Maginot Line and the German border and was therefore regarded as indefensible against a determined attack. In late May and early June the German attack was focused farther to the west, eventually breaking out behind the Line. From June 15 to June 20, 1940, Fermont helped to repel attacks on the neighboring ouvrage Ferme Chappy, as well as firing to the north. On June 17, German artillery of the 183rd Infantry Division opened fire on the rear of Block 4 with 88 mm guns. By chance, the firing stopped after the last shot had weakened the concrete to the point that another shot would have pierced it. The breach was repaired that night. The 161st Infantry Division under General Wilck then attacked Fermont and Latiremont on June 21 with 210 mm and 305 mm siege mortars, 105 mm guns and 88 mm high-velocity guns, causing a single death when a round penetrated a mortar cloche at Block 5.

In early 1941 the Germans staged an attack on Blocks 1 and 4 for movie cameras, promoting the resulting propaganda film as documentation of the June 1940 attacks. The Fermont area did not see significant fighting during the Lorraine Campaign of 1944, but Fermont's caserne was used as a place for rest and recuperation for American troops during the Battle of the Bulge.

=== Post-War ===
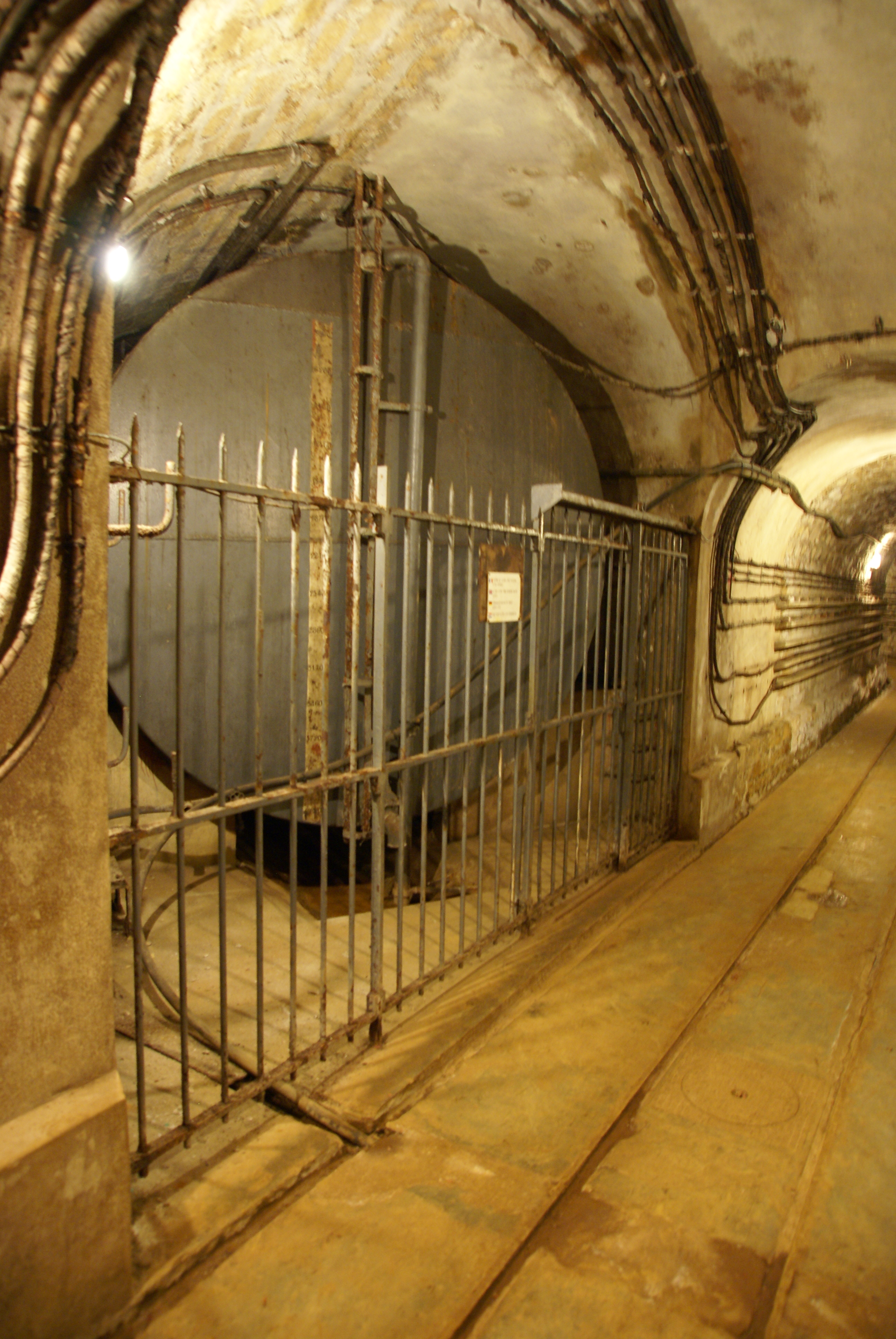
Cistern, with 60cm rails in the floor

By 1951 work was proceeding on renovation of many of the northeastern ouvrages, including Fermont, with the aim of restoring their combat capability to block a potential advance by the Warsaw Pact. Fermont and Latiremont were designated the môle de Crusnes, a fortified strongpoint. After the establishment of the French nuclear strike force, the importance of the Line declined. The ouvrage was abandoned by the military in 1967. In 1975 the property was transferred from the Ministry of Defense to an association for the restoration and preservation of Fermont, and in 1977 it was opened to the public.

== Current condition ==
The ouvrage, which retains a large portion of its equipment, was restored in 1977 and may be visited during the summer months. The museum is operated by the Association des Amis de l'Ouvrage de Fermont et de la Ligne Maginot. The ouvrage contains a working 60 cm rail line, which is used to carry visitors from the entry to the combat blocks. A museum on the surface features turrets from other ouvrages, including three from Bréhain and one from Molvange.

== See also ==
- List of all works on Maginot Line
- Siegfried Line
- Atlantic Wall
- Czechoslovak border fortifications

== Bibliography ==
- Allcorn, William. The Maginot Line 1928-45. Oxford: Osprey Publishing, 2003. ISBN 1-84176-646-1
- Kaufmann, J.E. and Kaufmann, H.W. Fortress France: The Maginot Line and French Defenses in World War II, Stackpole Books, 2006. ISBN 0-275-98345-5
- Degon, André; Zylberyng, Didier, La Ligne Maginot: Guide des Forts à Visiter, Editions Ouest-France, 2014. ISBN 978-2-7373-6080-0 (in French)
- Kaufmann, J.E., Kaufmann, H.W., Jancovič-Potočnik, A. and Lang, P. The Maginot Line: History and Guide, Pen and Sword, 2011. ISBN 978-1-84884-068-3
- Hohnadel, Alain; Sicard, Jacques. Hommes et Ouvrages de la Ligne Maginot, Tome 1. Paris, Histoire & Collections, 2001. ISBN 2-908182-88-2 (in French)
- Hohnadel, Alain; Sicard, Jacques. Hommes et Ouvrages de la Ligne Maginot, Tome 2. Paris, Histoire & Collections, 2003. ISBN 2-908182-97-1 (in French)
- Hohnadel, Alain; Sicard, Jacques. Hommes et Ouvrages de la Ligne Maginot, Tome 3. Paris, Histoire & Collections, 2003. ISBN 2-913903-88-6 (in French)
- Hohnadel, Alain; Sicard, Jacques. Hommes et Ouvrages de la Ligne Maginot, Tome 5. Paris, Histoire & Collections, 2009. ISBN 978-2-35250-127-5 (in French)
