= Ouvrage Ferme Chappy =

- Part of Maginot Line
- Northeast France
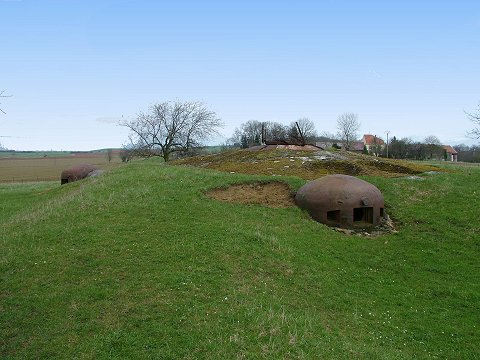
- Block 2, Ferme Chappy

Site information
- Owner: Private
- Controlled by: France
- Open to the public: No
- Condition: Abandoned and secured

Location
- Coordinates: 49.44944°N 5.62722°E

Site history
- Built by: CORF
- Materials: Concrete, steel, deep excavation
- Battles/wars: Battle of France, Lorraine Campaign

Ouvrage Ferme Chappy is a petit ouvrage of the Maginot Line in northeastern France. It is located at the western end of the Fortified Sector of the Crusnes near Longuyon in the Meurthe-et-Moselle département, facing Belgium. The gros ouvrage Fermont borders Ferme Chappy's artillery coverage to the east. A wide gap existed to the west in the direction of Longuyon, covered only by blockhouses and natural obstacles such as rivers. Ferme Chappy was assaulted by German forces during the Battle of France in June 1940, fending off the attack with artillery support from Fermont. Chappy surrendered with its neighbors on 27 June. It was abandoned after the war and is now private property.

== Design and construction ==
Ferme Chappy was approved for construction in April 1932. It was completed at a cost of 11 million francs. The ouvrage (Note: English-language sources use the French term ouvrage as the preferred term for the Maginot positions, in preference to "fort", a term usually reserved for older fortifications with passive defensives in the form of walls and ditches. The literal translation of ouvrage in the sense of a fortification in English is "work." A gros ouvrage is a large fortification with a significant artillery component, while a petit ouvrage is smaller, with lighter arms.) was named for the adjoining farm whose buildings sit nearly on top of the underground barracks and entry.

The ouvrage is immediately to the east of Longuyon and the valley of the Crusnes river, with a considerable space between Ferme Chappy and the next ouvrage to the west, Ouvrage Vélosnes. A gros ouvrage (Bois du Rafour) was planned immediately to the rear of Longuyon in the direction of Verdun, along with two casemates (Casemates de la Chaudronnerie) just to the south of Ferme Chappy, but were replaced by a dense series of blockhouses closer to Longuyon.

== Description ==
- Block 1: Entry block with two machine gun/anti-tank gun embrasures (JM/AC47), two machine gun embrasures (JM), two automatic rifle cloches (GFM) and one machine gun cloche (JM). The block also served as an observation post for Fermont.
- Block 2: one machine gun turret, one GFM cloche and one JM cloche.

A combination personnel and ammunition entry was planned for a second phase of construction. The block was intended to be equipped with a GFM cloche, an AC47/JM embrasure and two automatic rifle embrasures.

== Manning ==
The 1940 manning of the ouvrage under the command of Lieutenant Thibeau comprised 109 men and 3 officers of the 149th Fortress Infantry Regiment and the 152nd Position Artillery Regiment. The units were under the umbrella of the 42nd Fortress Corps of the 3rd Army, Army Group 2. The Caserne Lamy provided peacetime above-ground barracks and support services to Ferme Chappy and other fortifications in the area.

== History ==
See Fortified Sector of the Crusnes for a broader discussion of the events of 1940 in the Crusnes sector of the Maginot Line.

Ferme Chappy, lacking long-range artillery, played no part in the artillery fire of May 1940 between the larger ouvrages and opposing German forces in Belgium. After the Germans broke out behind the Maginot Line in June, Ferme Chappy was threatened from the rear. The ouvrage was attacked during the Battle of France on June 21 by the German 161st Infantry Division. The attack was repelled with help from the nearby gros ouvrage Fermont. Firing continued until the armistice of 25 June, but no further assault was launched by the Germans. Chappy's garrison surrendered to the Germans on 27 June after negotiations with German forces that were undertaken by Commandant Pophillat of Ouvrage Latiremont. Once the area was occupied, Chappy's machine gun turret was removed by the Germans, along with all of the interior fittings. The position saw no fighting in the 1944 Lorraine Campaign and remained abandoned after the war.

== Current condition ==
The ouvrage is the property of M. Peiffert who now owns the farm. The interior, though bare, remains in good condition. It is not open to the public.

== See also ==
- List of all works on Maginot Line
- Siegfried Line
- Atlantic Wall
- Czechoslovak border fortifications

== Bibliography ==
- Allcorn, William. The Maginot Line 1928-45. Oxford: Osprey Publishing, 2003. ISBN 1-84176-646-1
- Kaufmann, J.E. and Kaufmann, H.W. Fortress France: The Maginot Line and French Defenses in World War II, Stackpole Books, 2006. ISBN 0-275-98345-5
- Kaufmann, J.E., Kaufmann, H.W., Jancovič-Potočnik, A. and Lang, P. The Maginot Line: History and Guide, Pen and Sword, 2011. ISBN 978-1-84884-068-3
- Mary, Jean-Yves; Hohnadel, Alain; Sicard, Jacques. Hommes et Ouvrages de la Ligne Maginot, Tome 1. Paris, Histoire & Collections, 2001. ISBN 2-908182-88-2 (in French)
- Mary, Jean-Yves; Hohnadel, Alain; Sicard, Jacques. Hommes et Ouvrages de la Ligne Maginot, Tome 2. Paris, Histoire & Collections, 2003. ISBN 2-908182-97-1 (in French)
- Mary, Jean-Yves; Hohnadel, Alain; Sicard, Jacques. Hommes et Ouvrages de la Ligne Maginot, Tome 3. Paris, Histoire & Collections, 2003. ISBN 2-913903-88-6 (in French)
- Mary, Jean-Yves; Hohnadel, Alain; Sicard, Jacques. Hommes et Ouvrages de la Ligne Maginot, Tome 5. Paris, Histoire & Collections, 2009. ISBN 978-2-35250-127-5 (in French)
