= Ouvrage Bois-du-Four =

Preserved military fortification in France

Ouvrage A5 Bois du Four
- Part of Maginot Line
- Northeast France
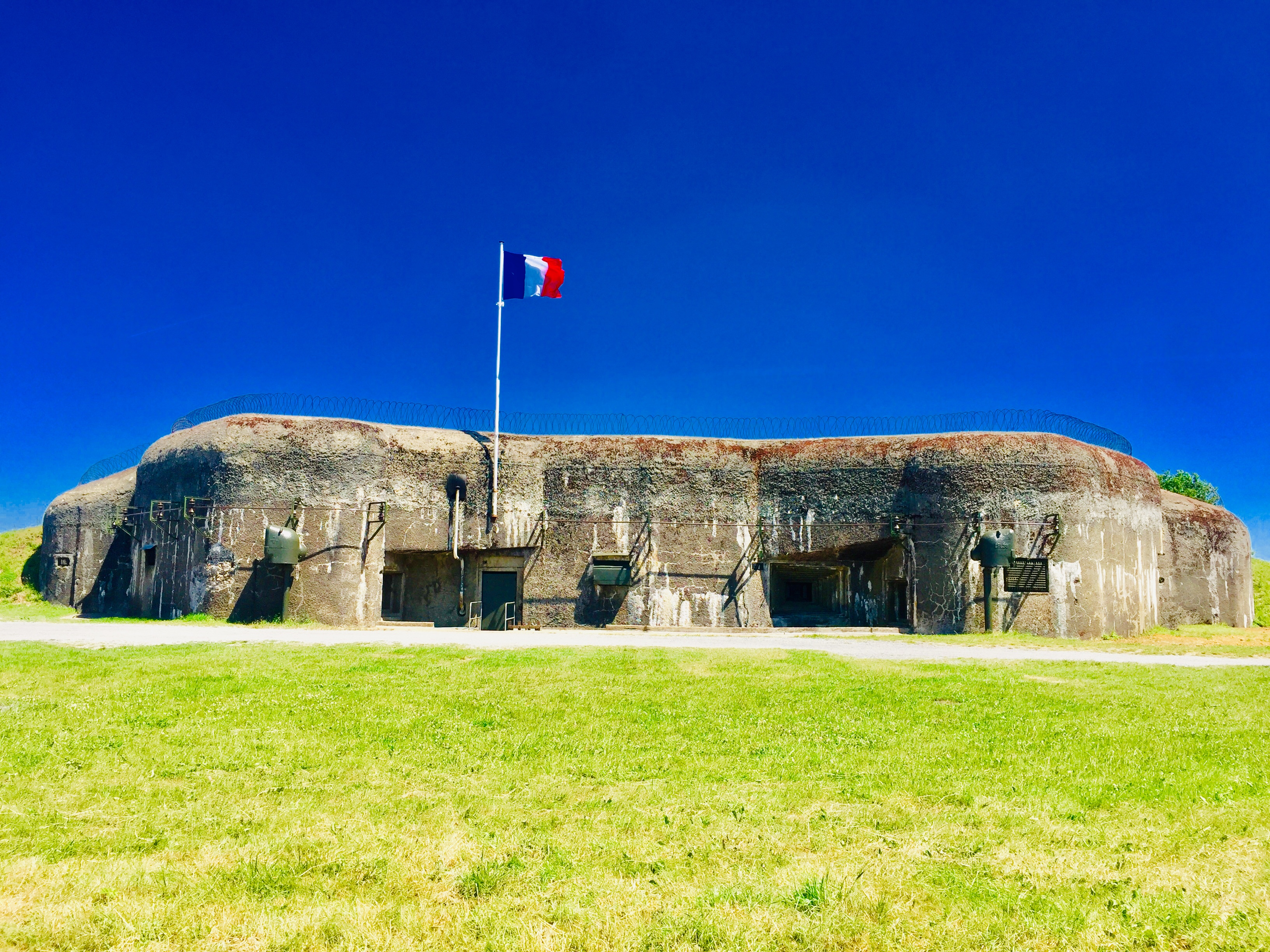

Site information
- Controlled by: France
- Open to the public: Yes

Location
- Coordinates: 49.4575°N 5.84361°E

Site history
- Built by: CORF
- In use: Preserved
- Materials: Concrete, steel, deep excavation
- Battles/wars: Battle of France, Lorraine Campaign

Ouvrage Bois-du-Four is a lesser work (petit ouvrage) in the Fortified Sector of the Crusnes of the Maginot Line. The ouvrage consists of a single large combat block without an underground gallery system, and is located between petit ouvrage Mauvais-Bois and gros ouvrage Bréhain, facing Luxembourg. A planned expansion, never carried out, was intended to enlarge Bois-du-Four into a fully equipped gros ouvrage. Bois-du-Four saw little action in either the Battle of France in 1940 or the Lorraine Campaign of 1944. It is preserved by the community of Villers-la-Montagne and may be visited.

== Design and construction ==
Bois-du-Four was approved for construction in May 1932. It was completed at a cost of 9 million francs by the contractor Monod of Paris. It was designed as a unitary double casemate, occupying a prominent rise in a cleared area. In a second phase, Bois-du-Four was to be expanded to a plan that would result in a close resemblance to its neighbor Bréhain, with five additional blocks mounting artillery, as well as remote entrances for munitions and personnel, and an extensive network of deep underground galleries. The rise in tensions between France and Germany in the late 1930s prevented this second phase from being pursued.

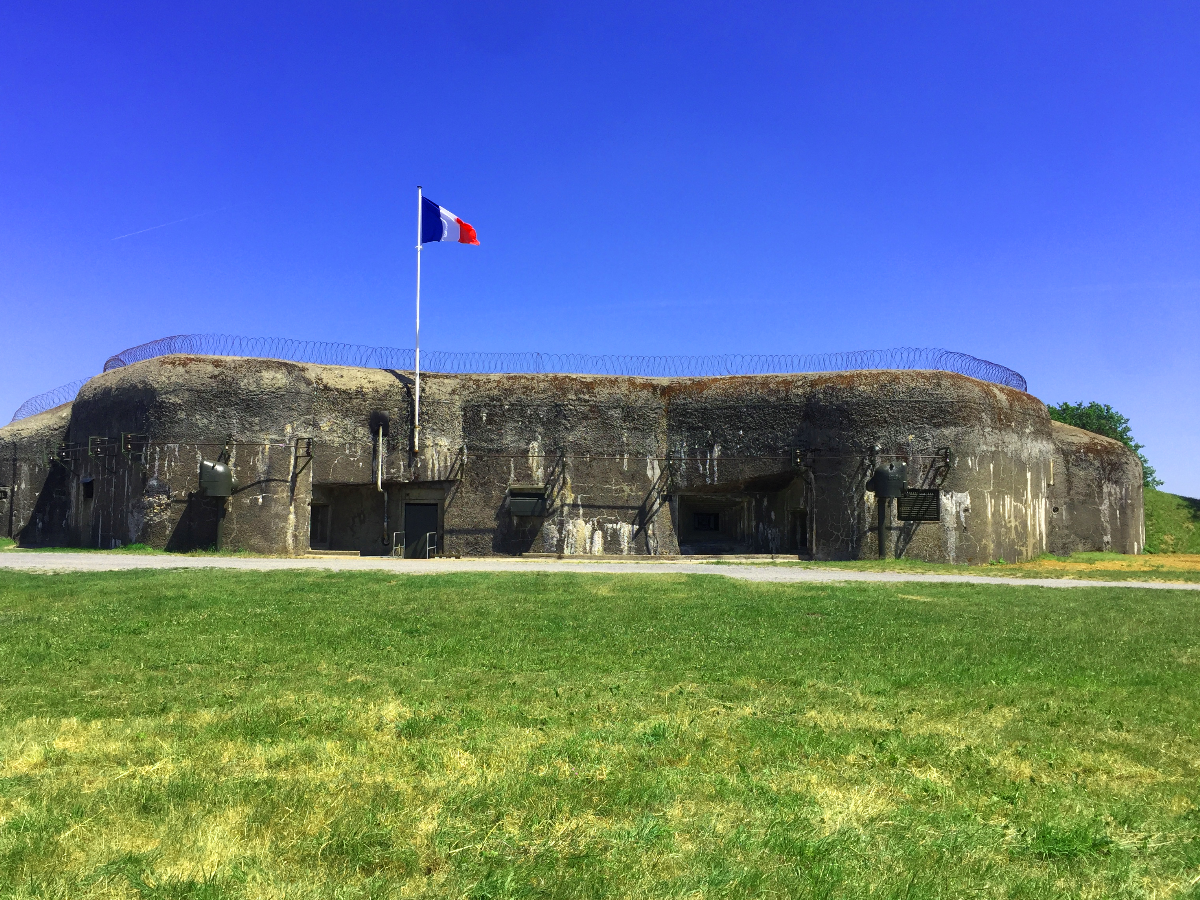

== Description ==
Only Block 1 of the proposed gros ouvrage (Note: English-language sources use the French term ouvrage as the preferred term for the Maginot positions, in preference to "fort", a term usually reserved for older fortifications with passive defensives in the form of walls and ditches. The literal translation of ouvrage in the sense of a fortification in English is "work." A gros ouvrage is a large fortification with a significant artillery component, while a petit ouvrage is smaller, with lighter arms.) was actually built, with five more combat blocks and two entry blocks deferred to a second phase that was never pursued. The large single block was arranged on two levels with a remarkably heavy armament. The proposed gros ouvrage would have been one of the most heavily armed artillery positions in the Line.

The single existing block was armed as follows:

- Block 1: combined infantry/artillery/entrance block with three automatic rifle cloches (GFM), one observation cloche (VDP) and one machine gun turret, as well as seven light machine guns, two heavy twin machine guns, three machine gun/47 mm anti-tank guns (JM/AC47), all in embrasures, and two 81mm mortars on the lower level. This block would have been the most northerly of the fully constructed ensemble.

The planned additional blocks were:

- Block 2 (unbuilt): Artillery block with one twin 75mm gun turret and one GFM cloche.
- Block 3 (unbuilt): Artillery block with one twin 75mm gun turret and one GFM cloche.
- Block 4 (unbuilt): Artillery block with one twin 75mm gun turret and one GFM cloche.
- Block 5 (unbuilt): Artillery block with one twin 135mm gun turret, one grenade launcher cloche (LG) and one GFM cloche.
- Block 6 (unbuilt): Artillery block with two GFM cloches, two machine gun cloches (JM), two AC47/JM embrasures and two light machine gun embrasures.
- Personnel entry (unbuilt): two GFM cloches, one grenade launcher cloche, two AC47/JM embrasures and two light machine gun embrasures.
- Munitions entry (unbuilt): two GFM cloches, one AC47/JM embrasure, one heavy twin machine gun and two light machine gun embrasures.

If built as intended, Bois-du-Four would have resembled its neighbor Bréhain, apart from Bois-du-Four's unusual initial block. A compact arrangement of combat blocks would have been connected to separate munitions and personnel entrances via a long, deeply buried underground gallery of more than 1,000 metres (3,300 ft) in length, with a utility area, barracks and an "M1" magazine located near the entries. The entries were to be located in a small ravine, giving shelter and allowing for simpler access to the level of the galleries.

=== Casemates and shelters ===
A series of detached casemates and infantry shelters surround Bois-du-Four, including

- Casemate de Villiers-la-Montagne Ouest: Single block with one JM/AC47 embrasure, one JM embrasure, one 81mm mortar cloche and one GFM cloche.
- Observatiore de Villiers-la-Montagne Centre: Single block with one JM/AC47 embrasure, one JM embrasure and one GFM cloche.
- Casemate de Villiers-la-Montagne Est: Single block with one JM/AC47 embrasure, one JM embrasure, one 81mm mortar cloche and one GFM cloche.
- Casemate de Verbusch Ouest: Single block with one JM/AC47 embrasure, one JM embrasure and two GFM cloches.
- Casemate de Verbusch Est: Single block with one JM/AC47 embrasure, one JM embrasure, one 81mm mortar cloche and one GFM cloche.
- Observatiore de la Ferme du Bois-du-Four: Observation block with one VP observation cloche and one GFM cloche, reporting to Bréhain.
- Casemate de la Ferme Thiéry: Single block with one JM/AC47 embrasure, one JM embrasure and two GFM cloches.
- Casemate de Bourène Ouest: Block with one mortar cloche and one GFM cloche.
- Casemate de Bourène Est: Double block with two JM/AC47 embrasure, two JM embrasure and two GFM cloches.

None of these are connected to the ouvrage or to each other. The Casernement de Morfortaine provided peacetime above-ground barracks and support services to Bois-du-Four and other positions in the area.

== Manning ==
The 1940 manning of the ouvrage under the command of Lieutenant de Mecquenem comprised 135 men and 2 officers of the 139th Fortress Infantry Regiment. The units were under the umbrella of the 42nd Fortress Corps of the 3rd Army, Army Group 2. de Mecquenem would go on to fight in Tunisia and eventually at Dien Bien Phu, retiring as a brigadier general.

== History ==
See Fortified Sector of the Crusnes for a broader discussion of the events of 1940 in the Crusnes sector of the Maginot Line.

In June 1940, the German 183rd Division considered a plan to penetrate the Maginot Line between Bois-du-Four and Mauvais-Bois, eventually rejecting it in favor of operations farther to the east. Bois-du-Four saw mostly harassing attacks through June. After the 22 June 1940 armistice brought an end to fighting, the Maginot fortifications to the west of the Moselle did not immediately surrender. They maintained their garrisons through a series of negotiations. Bois-du-Four, along with Mauvais-Bois, Bréhain and Aumetz surrendered on 27 June. The German occupiers stripped Bois-du-Four of its furnishings and equipment. The area of Bois-du-Four saw little action during the Lorraine Campaign of 1944.

During the 1950s and 1960s the Maginot Line was kept in readiness for possible use in the event of an invasion by the Warsaw Pact. After the establishment of the French nuclear strike force, the importance of the Line declined, and in 1970 Bois-du-Four was lowered in importance, allowing the use of formerly reserved areas around the ouvrage. During the 1970s the majority of the Maginot ouvrages, including Bois-du-Four, were sold to the public.

== Present ==
Bois-du-Four is maintained by the Association Ouvrage A5 Bois du Four of Villiers-la-Montagne, which took over the property in 1992. It is open to the public in summer months June to September open every Sunday. Departure of visits 2 p.m. and 4 p.m. Special weekends in June, August, September and December (see official website).

== See also ==
- List of all works on Maginot Line
- Siegfried Line
- Atlantic Wall
- Czechoslovak border fortifications

== Bibliography ==
- Allcorn, William. The Maginot Line 1928-45. Oxford: Osprey Publishing, 2003. ISBN 1-84176-646-1
- Degon, André; Zylberyng, Didier, La Ligne Maginot: Guide des Forts à Visiter, Editions Ouest-France, 2014. ISBN 978-2-7373-6080-0 (in French)
- Kaufmann, J.E. and Kaufmann, H.W. Fortress France: The Maginot Line and French Defenses in World War II, Stackpole Books, 2006. ISBN 0-275-98345-5
- Kaufmann, J.E., Kaufmann, H.W., Jancovič-Potočnik, A. and Lang, P. The Maginot Line: History and Guide, Pen and Sword, 2011. ISBN 978-1-84884-068-3
- Mary, Jean-Yves; Hohnadel, Alain; Sicard, Jacques. Hommes et Ouvrages de la Ligne Maginot, Tome 1. Paris, Histoire & Collections, 2001. ISBN 2-908182-88-2 (in French)
- Mary, Jean-Yves; Hohnadel, Alain; Sicard, Jacques. Hommes et Ouvrages de la Ligne Maginot, Tome 2. Paris, Histoire & Collections, 2003. ISBN 2-908182-97-1 (in French)
- Mary, Jean-Yves; Hohnadel, Alain; Sicard, Jacques. Hommes et Ouvrages de la Ligne Maginot, Tome 3. Paris, Histoire & Collections, 2003. ISBN 2-913903-88-6 (in French)
- Mary, Jean-Yves; Hohnadel, Alain; Sicard, Jacques. Hommes et Ouvrages de la Ligne Maginot, Tome 5. Paris, Histoire & Collections, 2009. ISBN 978-2-35250-127-5 (in French)
- Séramour, Michaël. L'ouvrage A5 Bois du Four ou Histoire du phénix de la ligne Maginot : 1932-2012 Metz, Edition des Paraiges. 2012. ISBN 979-10-90185-18-0 (in French)
