= Ouvrage Mauvais-Bois =

Former French military fortification

- Part of Maginot Line
- Northeast France

Site information
- Owner: Private
- Controlled by: France
- Condition: Abandoned

Location
- Coordinates: 49.46491°N 5.79596°E

Site history
- Built by: CORF
- Materials: Concrete, steel, deep excavation
- Battles/wars: Battle of France, Lorraine Campaign

Ouvrage Mauvais-Bois is a petit ouvrage of the Fortified Sector of the Crusnes on the Maginot Line. It is located between the gros ouvrage Latiremont and the petit ouvrage Bois-du-Four, facing the Belgium/Luxembourg border. The original plan for the position was for two phases of construction, resulting in a gros ouvrage provided with heavy artillery. The increase in tension between France and Germany in the late 1930s caused resources to be diverted elsewhere, and only the first three combat blocks were built. In 1940 the ouvrage was regularly bombarded, but not directly attacked by German infantry. When the French military divested itself of the majority of the Maginot fortifications, Mauvais-Bois was the second to be sold.

== Design and construction ==
Mauvais-Bois was approved for construction in October 1931. It was completed at a cost of 11 million francs by the contractor Monod of Paris. The initial phase consisted of three combat blocks linked by deep underground galleries. In a second phase, Mauvais-Bois was to be expanded to function as a gros ouvrage, (Note: English-language sources use the French term ouvrage as the preferred term for the Maginot positions, in preference to "fort", a term usually reserved for older fortifications with passive defensives in the form of walls and ditches. The literal translation of ouvrage in the sense of a fortification in English is "work." A gros ouvrage is a large fortification with a significant artillery component, while a petit ouvrage is smaller, with lighter arms.) with two additional blocks mounting artillery, as well as remote entrances for munitions and personnel, and a larger network of deep underground galleries. The rise in tensions between France and Germany in the late 1930s prevented this second phase from being pursued.

== Description ==
Three combat blocks were built at Mauvais-Bois, linked with underground galleries and with an incomplete gallery extending in the direction of the proposed artillery blocks and entrance blocks.

- Block 1: Entry, one machine gun/anti-tank gun embrasure (JM/AC 47), two GFM cloches and one machine gun cloche (JM)
- Block 2: one JM/AC47 embrasure, one JM embrasure and two GFM cloches.
- Block 3: one machine gun turret and two GFM cloches.

The unbuilt portions of the ouvrage were projected to be:

- Block 4 (unbuilt): one 75mm twin gun turret and two GFM cloches.
- Block 5 (unbuilt): one 75mm twin gun turret and two GFM cloches.
- Personnel entry (unbuilt): one grenade launcher cloche, two GFM cloches, two JM/AC47 embrasures and two heavy twin machine gun embrasures.
- Munitions entry (unbuilt): two GFM cloches, one JM/AC47 embrasure and two light machine gun embrasures.

=== Casemates and shelters ===
A series of detached casemates and infantry shelters surround Bois-du-Four, including the:

- Casemate de Morfontaine: Double block with two JM/AC47 embrasure, two JM embrasures and two GFM cloches.
- Casemate de Laix: Single block with one JM/AC47 embrasure, one JM embrasure, one 81mm mortar cloche and one GFM cloche.
- Casemate de Jalaumont Est: Block with one two cloches, one VDP observation cloche and one GFM cloche.
- Observatiore de Haut-de-la-Vigne: Observation block with one VP observation cloche and one GFM cloche, reporting to Bréhain.
- Casemate de Chénières Ouest: Block with one mortar cloche and one GFM cloche.
- Casemate de Chénières Est: Double block with two JM/AC47 embrasures, one JM embrasure one mortar cloche and two GFM cloches.

None of these are connected to the ouvrage or to each other. The Casernement de Morfortaine provided peacetime above-ground barracks and support services to Mauvais-Bois and other positions in the area.

== Manning ==
The 1940 manning of the ouvrage under the command of Lieutenant de Mecquenem comprised 135 men and 2 officers of the 139th Fortress Infantry Regiment. The units were under the umbrella of the 42nd Fortress Corps of the 3rd Army, Army Group 2. de Mecquenem would go on to fight in Tunisia and eventually at Dien Bien Phu, retiring as a brigadier general.

== History ==
See Fortified Sector of the Crusnes for a broader discussion of the events of 1940 in the Crusnes sector of the Maginot Line.

In June 1940, the German 183rd Division considered a plan to penetrate the Maginot Line between Bois-du-Four and Mauvais-Bois, eventually rejecting it in favor of operations farther to the east. Mauvais-Bois saw mostly harassing attacks through June. After the 22 June 1940 armistice brought an end to fighting, the Maginot fortifications to the west of the Moselle did not immediately surrender. They maintained their garrisons through a series of negotiations. Mauvais-Bois, along with Bois-du-Four, Bréhain and Aumetz surrendered on 27 June. The area of Mauvais-Bois saw little action during the Lorraine Campaign of 1944.

During the 1950s and 1960s the Maginot Line was kept in readiness for possible use in the event of an invasion by the Warsaw Pact. After the establishment of the French nuclear strike force, the importance of the Line declined, and in 1970 Mauvais-Bois was lowered in importance, allowing the use of formerly reserved areas around the ouvrage. Mauvais-Bois was the second Maginot ouvrage to be sold to the public.

== Current ==
Mauvais-Bois is privately owned and is not accessible to the public. It is reported to be in poor condition, with all metal components salvaged. The Casemate de Morfortaine may be visited by appointment with the owner, who seeks to restore it.

== See also ==
- List of all works on Maginot Line
- Siegfried Line
- Atlantic Wall
- Czechoslovak border fortifications

== Bibliography ==
- Allcorn, William. The Maginot Line 1928-45. Oxford: Osprey Publishing, 2003. ISBN 1-84176-646-1
- Kaufmann, J.E. and Kaufmann, H.W. Fortress France: The Maginot Line and French Defenses in World War II, Stackpole Books, 2006. ISBN 0-275-98345-5
- Kaufmann, J.E., Kaufmann, H.W., Jancovič-Potočnik, A. and Lang, P. The Maginot Line: History and Guide, Pen and Sword, 2011. ISBN 978-1-84884-068-3
- Mary, Jean-Yves; Hohnadel, Alain; Sicard, Jacques. Hommes et Ouvrages de la Ligne Maginot, Tome 1. Paris, Histoire & Collections, 2001. ISBN 2-908182-88-2 (in French)
- Mary, Jean-Yves; Hohnadel, Alain; Sicard, Jacques. Hommes et Ouvrages de la Ligne Maginot, Tome 2. Paris, Histoire & Collections, 2003. ISBN 2-908182-97-1 (in French)
- Mary, Jean-Yves; Hohnadel, Alain; Sicard, Jacques. Hommes et Ouvrages de la Ligne Maginot, Tome 3. Paris, Histoire & Collections, 2003. ISBN 2-913903-88-6 (in French)
- Mary, Jean-Yves; Hohnadel, Alain; Sicard, Jacques. Hommes et Ouvrages de la Ligne Maginot, Tome 5. Paris, Histoire & Collections, 2009. ISBN 978-2-35250-127-5 (in French)
