= Ouvrage Bréhain =

Ouvrage of the Maginot Line

- Part of Maginot Line
- Northeast France

Site information
- Controlled by: France

Location
- Coordinates: 49.44426°N 5.90379°E

Site history
- Built by: CORF
- Materials: Concrete, steel, deep excavation
- Battles/wars: Battle of France, Lorraine Campaign

Ouvrage Bréhain is part of the Fortified Sector of the Crusnes of the Maginot Line, located near the community of Bréhain-la-Ville in the Meurthe-et-Moselle department of France. Bréhain is flanked by petits ouvrages Mauvais Bois and Aumetz. The gros ouvrage was equipped with long-range artillery, and faced the border with Luxembourg. It saw no major action in either the Battle of France in 1940 or the Lorraine Campaign of 1944. While not open to public visitation, it has been secured and is in relatively good condition when compared to other abandoned Maginot positions. A flanking casemate has been restored and may be visited.

== Design and construction ==
Bréhain was approved for construction in May 1931. It was completed at a cost of 84 million francs by the contractor Ballot of Paris. Compared with its neighbours, the ultimate plans for Aumetz, Bréhain, Bois-du-Four and Ouvrage Mauvais-Bois closely resemble each other, but Bréhain is the most fully realised, with only one unbuilt combat block and an unconnected casemate block. Its neighbours were built as petits ouvrages, to be developed with full tunnel networks at a later date.

== Description ==
Bréhain is a large ouvrage (Note: English-language sources use the French term ouvrage as the preferred term for the Maginot positions, in preference to "fort", a term usually reserved for older fortifications with passive defensives in the form of walls and ditches. The literal translation of ouvrage in the sense of a fortification in English is "work." A gros ouvrage is a large fortification with a significant artillery component, while a petit ouvrage is smaller, with lighter arms.) with a gallery system extending over 1,500 metres (4,900 ft) from end to end. The munitions and personnel entries are located far to the rear of the compactly arranged combat blocks, with the entries hidden in the woods. An "M1" ammunition magazine is located just inside the ammunition entry, while the underground barracks are located near the junction of the two entry galleries. From there a long, straight gallery runs at an average depth of 30 metres (98 ft) to eight combat blocks. As part of an uncommenced second phase, Bréhain was to receive a second 135 mm turret. A gallery was projected to link the turret block to the Casemate de l'Ouest de Bréhain, which was built as (and remained) an unconnected infantry combat block.

The ouvrage has two entries and eight combat blocks:

- Ammunition entry: shaft access (elevator), two automatic rifle cloches (GFM), one machine gun/47 mm anti-tank gun embrasure (JM/AC47).
- Personnel entry: shaft access (stairs), two GFM cloches, one JM/AC47 embrasure and one grenade launcher cloche (LG).
- Block 1: Infantry block with one machine gun turret and one GFM cloche.
- Block 2: Infantry block with one machine gun turret and one GFM cloche.
- Block 3: Observation block with one GFM cloche (with emergency exit) and one observation cloche (VDP).
- Block 4: Artillery block with one 75 mm gun turret.
- Block 5: Artillery block with one 135 mm gun turret and one GFM cloche.
- Block 6: Artillery block with one 75 mm gun turret and one grenade launcher cloche.
- Block 7: Artillery block with one 81 mm mortar turret and one GFM cloche.
- Block 8: Infantry block with one GFM cloche and one machine gun cloche (JM).
- Block 9 (not built): Artillery block with one 135 mm gun turret and one GFM cloche.

=== Casemates and shelters ===
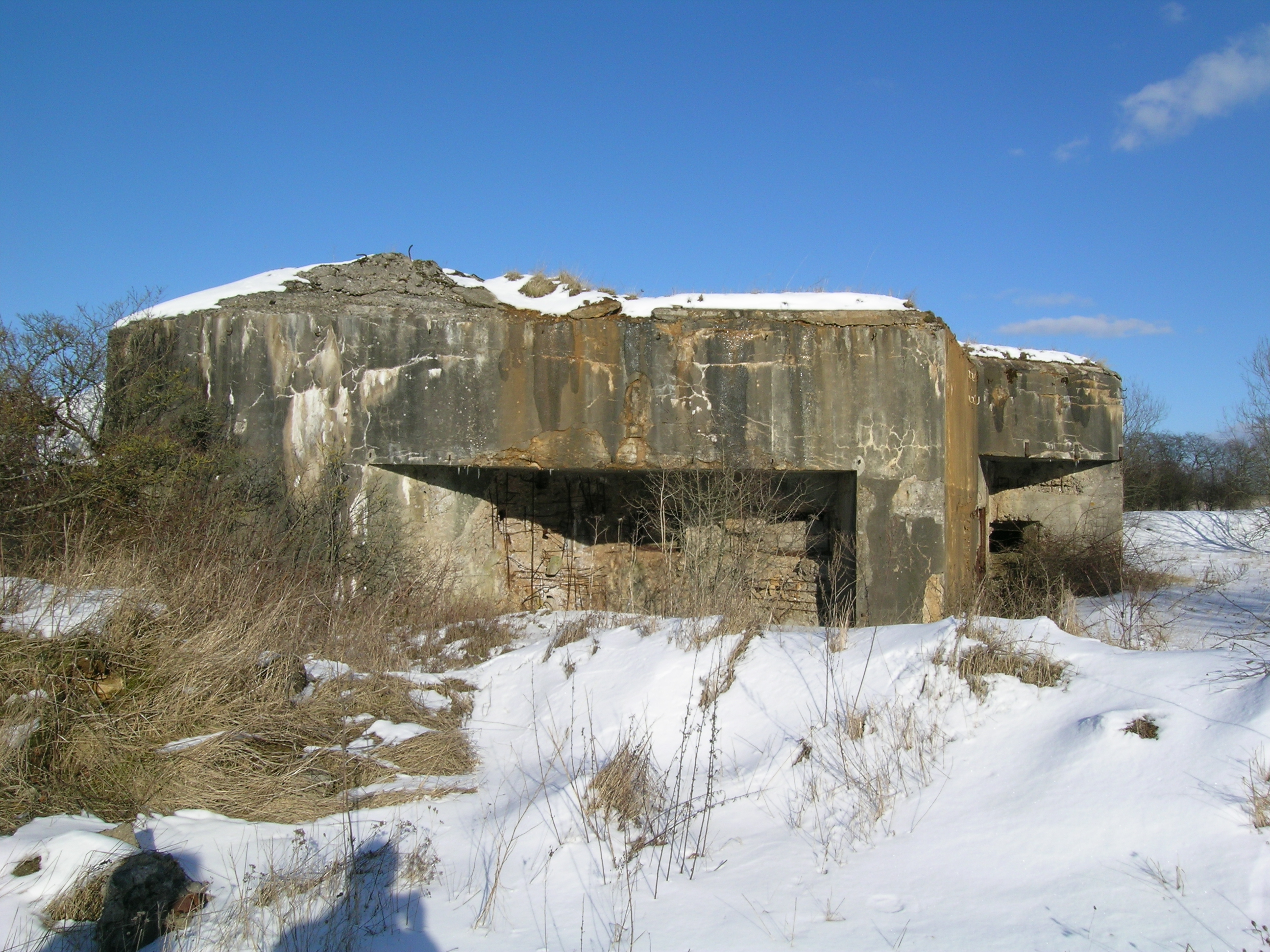
The Ravin de Crusnes casemate

A series of detached casemates and infantry shelters surround Bréhain, including

- Casemate de l'Ouest de Bréhain or Casemate C2: Planned to eventually be linked to the main ouvrage, it is in effect an unconnected combat block with one JM/AC47 embrasure, one JM embrasure, one mortar turret and two GFM cloches. The casemate has been restored and functions as a small museum. 49°26′34.35″N 5°53′52.35″E
- Block 7: Artillery block with one 81 mm mortar turret and one GFM cloche.
- Casemate de la Ravin-de-Crusnes: Single block with one JM/AC47 embrasure, one JM embrasure, one 81 mm mortar cloche and one GFM cloche.
- Casemate de Crusnes Ouest: Single block with one JM/AC47 embrasure, one JM embrasure, one VDP observation cloche and one GFM cloche.
- Casemate de Crusnes Est: Block with one mortar cloche and two GFM cloches.
- Casemate de Nouveau-Crusnes Ouest: Single block with one JM/AC47 embrasure, one JM embrasure and one GFM cloche.
- Casemate de Nouveau-Crusnes Est: Block with one mortar cloche and one GFM cloche.
- Casemate du Réservoir: Single block with one JM/AC47 embrasure, one JM embrasure, one 81 mm mortar cloche and one GFM cloche.
- Casemate de la Route d'Ottange Ouest: Single block with one JM/AC47 embrasure, one JM embrasure and one GFM cloche.
- Casemate de la Route d'Ottange Centre: Block with one mortar cloche and one GFM cloche.
- Casemate de la Route d'Ottange Ouest: Single block with one JM/AC47 embrasure, one JM embrasure, one 81 mm mortar cloche and one GFM cloche.
- Observatiore du Réservoir: Observation block with one VP observation cloche reporting to Ouvrage Rochonvillers

The Casernement d'Errouville provided peacetime above-ground barracks and support services to Bréhain and other fortifications in the area. The Observatiore de la Ferme du Bois-du-Four near the petit ouvrage Bois-du-Four reported to Bréhain, as did the Observatiore de Haut-de-la-Vigne near Mauvais-Bois.

== Manning ==
The 1940 manning of the ouvrage under the command of Commandant Vanier comprised 615 men and 22 officers of the 128th Fortress Infantry Regiment and the 152nd Position Artillery Regiment. The units were under the umbrella of the 42nd Fortress Corps of the 3rd Army, Army Group 2.

== History ==
=== 1940 ===
See Fortified Sector of the Crusnes for a broader discussion of the events of 1940 in the Crusnes sector of the Maginot Line.

On 21 June 1940 Brehain engaged advancing German troops, but saw no serious action Bréhain's chief efforts went to the support of neighbouring fortifications, with 20,250 75mm, 1,780 81mm and 2,220 135mm shells fired between September 1939 and June 1940. 4200 shots were fired in support of actions at Esch 10–14 May 1940, and 10,145 shots of all kinds were fired 13–25 June 1940. The 22-June-1940 armistice brought an end to fighting. However, the Maginot fortifications to the west of the Moselle did not surrender immediately, maintaining their garrisons through a series of negotiations. Bréhain, along with Mauvais-Bois, Bois-du-Four and Aumetz surrendered on 27 June.

=== Cold War ===
In 1951 Bréhain was renovated for use against a potential invasion by Warsaw Pact forces, becoming part of the môle de Rochonvillers strongpoint in company with Rochonvillers, Molvange and later Immerhof. After the establishment of the French nuclear strike force, the importance of the Line declined, and most locations were sold to the public or abandoned.

== Current condition ==
The site has been secured since its abandonment and is in relatively good condition. It remains the property of the Army. Casemate C2, located along the RN 52 road, has been restored and may at times be open to the public.

== See also ==
- List of all works on Maginot Line
- Siegfried Line
- Atlantic Wall
- Czechoslovak border fortifications

== Bibliography ==
- Allcorn, William. The Maginot Line 1928-45. Oxford: Osprey Publishing, 2003. ISBN 1-84176-646-1
- Kaufmann, J.E. and Kaufmann, H.W. Fortress France: The Maginot Line and French Defenses in World War II, Stackpole Books, 2006. ISBN 0-275-98345-5
- Kaufmann, J.E., Kaufmann, H.W., Jancovič-Potočnik, A. and Lang, P. The Maginot Line: History and Guide, Pen and Sword, 2011. ISBN 978-1-84884-068-3
- Mary, Jean-Yves; Hohnadel, Alain; Sicard, Jacques. Hommes et Ouvrages de la Ligne Maginot, Tome 1. Paris, Histoire & Collections, 2001. ISBN 2-908182-88-2 (in French)
- Mary, Jean-Yves; Hohnadel, Alain; Sicard, Jacques. Hommes et Ouvrages de la Ligne Maginot, Tome 2. Paris, Histoire & Collections, 2003. ISBN 2-908182-97-1 (in French)
- Mary, Jean-Yves; Hohnadel, Alain; Sicard, Jacques. Hommes et Ouvrages de la Ligne Maginot, Tome 3. Paris, Histoire & Collections, 2003. ISBN 2-913903-88-6 (in French)
- Mary, Jean-Yves; Hohnadel, Alain; Sicard, Jacques. Hommes et Ouvrages de la Ligne Maginot, Tome 5. Paris, Histoire & Collections, 2009. ISBN 978-2-35250-127-5 (in French)
