= Ouvrage Flaut =

- Part of Maginot Line, Alpine Line
- Southeast France
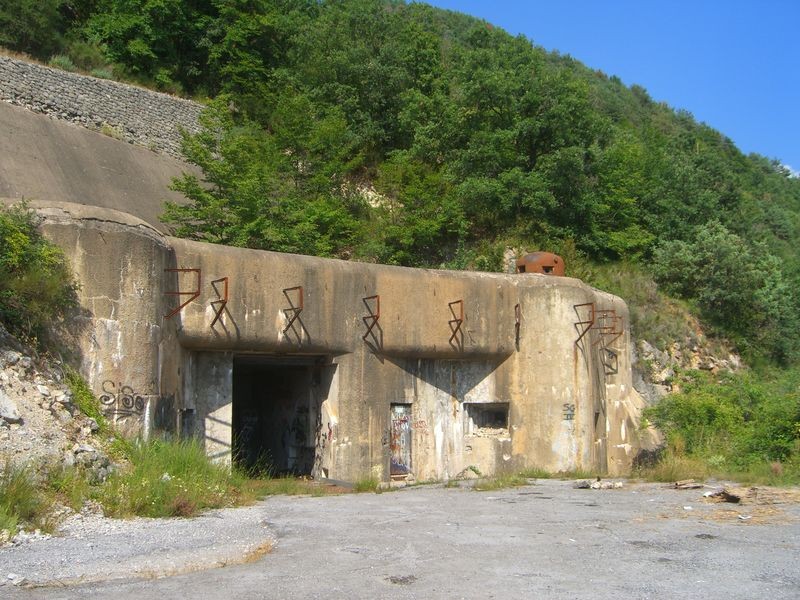
- Entry to Flaut

Site information
- Controlled by: France

Location
- Coordinates: 44.003039°N 7.330931°E

Site history
- Built by: CORF
- In use: Abandoned
- Materials: Concrete, steel, rock excavation
- Battles/wars: Italian invasion of France, Operation Dragoon

Ouvrage Flaut is a work (gros ouvrage) of the Maginot Line's Alpine extension, the Alpine Line, also called the Little Maginot Line. The ouvrage consists of one entry block, one infantry block and one artillery block at an altitude of 771 metres (2,530 ft). The position was intended, acting with Ouvrage Gordolon, to stop an approach by Italian forces from the north towards Nice through the Vésibie Valley.

== Description ==
Flaut was built between November 1931 and March 1935, by a contractor named Borie. The cost was 23.5 million francs. The ouvrage is laid out in the shape of a T, with a gallery running straight into the hillside to block 3 with the barracks, ammunition magazine and usine in galleries to either side. Halfway to Block 3 a long gallery extends to the left, connecting to blocks 4 and 5.

- Block 1 (entry): one machine gun cloche, one grenade launcher cloche and one machine gun/47mm anti-tank gun embrasure.
- Block 2 (artillery): one machine gun cloche and two 81mm mortar embrasures.
- Block 3 (artillery): one machine gun cloche, two heavy twin machine gun cloches, one observation cloche and two 76mm gun embrasures.
- Block 4 (artillery): one machine gun cloche, one heavy twin machine gun cloche, one observation cloche, one heavy twin machine gun embrasure and two 81mm mortar embrasures.
- Block 5 (infantry): one machine gun cloche, one observation cloche and one heavy twin machine gun embrasure.

A sixth block was proposed with a 75mm gun turret but not built. Five observation posts reported to Flaut, including Caire-Saint-Saveur, Tête Saint-Saveur, and Castel-Viel.

== History ==
During 1940 the artillery of Flaut was heavily involved in firing against III Italian Corps.

== See also ==
- List of Alpine Line ouvrages

== Bibliography ==
- Allcorn, William. The Maginot Line 1928-45. Oxford: Osprey Publishing, 2003. ISBN 1-84176-646-1
- Kaufmann, J.E. and Kaufmann, H.W. Fortress France: The Maginot Line and French Defenses in World War II, Stackpole Books, 2006. ISBN 0-275-98345-5
- Kaufmann, J.E., Kaufmann, H.W., Jancovič-Potočnik, A. and Lang, P. The Maginot Line: History and Guide, Pen and Sword, 2011. ISBN 978-1-84884-068-3
- Mary, Jean-Yves; Hohnadel, Alain; Sicard, Jacques. Hommes et Ouvrages de la Ligne Maginot, Tome 1. Paris, Histoire & Collections, 2001. ISBN 2-908182-88-2 (in French)
- Mary, Jean-Yves; Hohnadel, Alain; Sicard, Jacques. Hommes et Ouvrages de la Ligne Maginot, Tome 4 - La fortification alpine. Paris, Histoire & Collections, 2009. ISBN 978-2-915239-46-1 (in French)
- Mary, Jean-Yves; Hohnadel, Alain; Sicard, Jacques. Hommes et Ouvrages de la Ligne Maginot, Tome 5. Paris, Histoire & Collections, 2009. ISBN 978-2-35250-127-5 (in French)
