= Ouvrage Latiremont =

Fortification of the Maginot Line

- Part of Maginot Line
- Northeast France
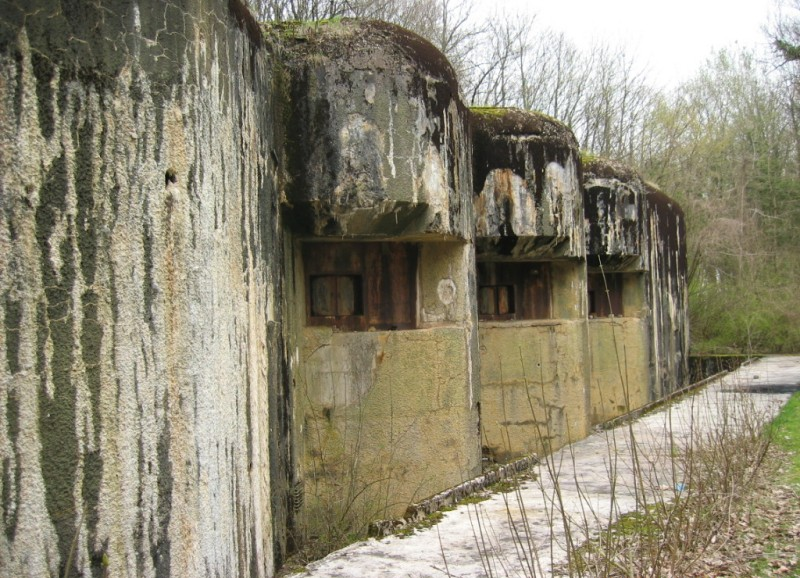
- Block 6, front

Site information
- Controlled by: France

Location
- Coordinates: 49.46104°N 5.74293°E

Site history
- Built by: CORF
- In use: Abandoned
- Materials: Concrete, steel, deep excavation
- Battles/wars: Battle of France, Lorraine Campaign

Ouvrage Latiremont is a gros ouvrage of the Maginot Line, located in the Fortified Sector of the Crusnes, sub-sector of Arrancy. It lies between the gros ouvrage Fermont and the petit ouvrage Mauvais Bois, facing Belgium. The village of Doncourt-Cités is nearby. Latiremont was active in 1939-1940, coming under direct attack in late June 1940. It surrendered to German forces on 27 June. After renovations during the Cold War, it was abandoned.

== Design and construction ==
The site was surveyed by CORF (Commission d'Organisation des Régions Fortifiées), the Maginot Line's design and construction agency, in early 1931. Latiremont was approved for construction in May 1931. It was completed at a cost of 88 million francs by the contractor Monod of Paris. Latiremont was designed from the beginning as a gros ouvrage (Note: English-language sources use the French term ouvrage as the preferred term for the Maginot positions, in preference to "fort", a term usually reserved for older fortifications with passive "defensives" in the form of walls and ditches. The literal translation of ouvrage in the sense of a fortification in English is "work." A gros ouvrage is a large fortification with a significant artillery component, while a petit ouvrage is smaller, with lighter arms.) with casemate-mounted 75mm guns. A second phase was planned, to add 75mm and 135mm gun turret blocks. By the late 1930s, resources had been allocated elsewhere, and the turret blocks were not built.

More than 1,200 metres (3,900 ft) of underground galleries connect the entries to the farthest block, at an average depth of 30 metres (98 ft). An "M1" magazine, arranged with parallel galleries connected by cross galleries, is located close to the ammunition entrance, while the underground barracks and utility areas are just inside the personnel entry. The gallery system was served by a narrow gauge (60 cm) railway that continued out the ammunition entry and connected to a regional military railway system for the movement of materiel along the front a few kilometres to the rear. Several "stations" along the gallery system, located in wider sections of gallery, permitted trains to pass or be stored.

== Description ==
Latiremont has two entrances and six combat blocks. Most of the blocks are in and around the Bois de Pracourt.

- Ammunition entrance: two automatic rifle cloches (GFM), one machine gun/anti-tank gun embrasure (JM/AC47).
- Personnel entrance: one GFM cloche, one grenade launcher cloche, one JM/AC47 embrasure
- Block 1: Infantry block with two machine gun cloches (JM) and one GFM cloche.
- Block 2: Infantry block with one machine-gun turret, one GFM cloche, one JM cloche and one periscope cloche (VDP).
- Block 3: Infantry block with one machine-gun turret and one GFM cloche.
- Block 4: Artillery block with one 81mm mortar turret, one JM embrasure, one JM/AC47 embrasure and one GFM cloche.
- Block 5: Artillery block with three 75mm gun embrasures, two GFM cloches and one LG cloche/grenade launcher cloche (LG).
- Block 6: Artillery block with three 75mm gun embrasures and two GFM cloches.
- Personnel entry: one grenade launcher cloche, one GFM cloche, three light machine gun embrasures and one JM/AC47 embrasure.
- Munitions entry: two GFM cloches, three light machine gun embrasures and one JM/AC47 embrasure.

Unbuilt blocks:

- Block 7 (unbuilt): Artillery block with a twin 75mm gun turret and two GFM cloches.
- Block 8 (unbuilt): Artillery block with a twin 135mm gun turret, one grenade launcher cloche and one GFM cloche.

=== Casemates and shelters ===
A series of detached casemates and infantry shelters surround Latiremont, including the:

- Casemate de Jalaumont Ouest: Single block with one JM/AC47 embrasure, one JM embrasure and one GFM cloche.
- Casemate du Haut-de-l'Anguille Ouest: Single block with one JM/AC47 embrasure, one JM embrasure and two GFM cloches.
- Casemate du Haut-de-l'Anguille Est: Single block with one JM/AC47 embrasure, one JM embrasure and two GFM cloches.
- Casemate du Bois-de-Tappe Ouest: Single block with one JM/AC47 embrasure, one JM embrasure and two GFM cloches.
- Casemate du Bois-de-Tappe Est: Single block with one JM/AC47 embrasure, one JM embrasure and two GFM cloches.
- Casemate de l'Ermitage Saint-Quentin: Single block with one JM/AC47 embrasure, one JM embrasure, one mortar cloche and one GFM cloche.
- Casemate de Pracourt: Single block with one JM/AC47 embrasure, two mortar cloches and two GFM cloches.

None of these are connected to the ouvrage or to each other. The Casernement de Doncourt provided peacetime above-ground barracks and support services to Latiremont and other ouvrages in the area.

== Manning ==
The 1940 manning of the ouvrage under the command of Commandant Pophillat comprised 21 officers and 580 men of the 149th Fortress Infantry Regiment. The units were under the umbrella of the 42nd Fortress Corps of the 3rd Army, Army Group 2.

== History ==
See Fortified Sector of the Crusnes for a broader discussion of the events of 1940 in the Crusnes sector of the Maginot Line.

From September 1939 to June 1940, Latiremont fired 14,452 75mm rounds and 4,234 81mm rounds at German forces and in support of neighboring units. It was not until June 1940 that Latiremont and Fermont were directly attacked by the German 161st Division, which brought 21 cm howitzers and 30.5 cm mortars to bear on 21 June. By this time, German units were moving in the rear of the Line, cutting power and communications. Heavy fire from Fermont and Latiremont repelled attacks. Firing continued until 25 June. Latiremont's garrison surrendered to the Germans on 27 June. In 1944 the area did not see significant fighting.

By 1951, work was proceeding on renovation of many of the northeastern ouvrages, including Latiremont, with the aim of restoring their combat capability to block a potential advance by the Warsaw Pact. Latiremont and Fermont designated the môle de Crusnes, a fortified strongpoint. After the establishment of the French nuclear strike force, the importance of the Line declined.

== Present status ==
Latiremont is abandoned, but secured. It has served as a source of material for Maginot museums and has suffered from water ingress, staining floors and walls.

== See also ==
- List of all works on Maginot Line
- Siegfried Line
- Atlantic Wall
- Czechoslovak border fortifications

== Bibliography ==
- Allcorn, William. The Maginot Line 1928-45. Oxford: Osprey Publishing, 2003. ISBN 1-84176-646-1
- Kaufmann, J.E. and Kaufmann, H.W. Fortress France: The Maginot Line and French Defenses in World War II, Stackpole Books, 2006. ISBN 0-275-98345-5
- Kaufmann, J.E., Kaufmann, H.W., Jancovič-Potočnik, A. and Lang, P. The Maginot Line: History and Guide, Pen and Sword, 2011. ISBN 978-1-84884-068-3
- Mary, Jean-Yves; Hohnadel, Alain; Sicard, Jacques. Hommes et Ouvrages de la Ligne Maginot, Tome 1. Paris, Histoire & Collections, 2001. ISBN 2-908182-88-2 (in French)
- Mary, Jean-Yves; Hohnadel, Alain; Sicard, Jacques. Hommes et Ouvrages de la Ligne Maginot, Tome 2. Paris, Histoire & Collections, 2003. ISBN 2-908182-97-1 (in French)
- Mary, Jean-Yves; Hohnadel, Alain; Sicard, Jacques. Hommes et Ouvrages de la Ligne Maginot, Tome 3. Paris, Histoire & Collections, 2003. ISBN 2-913903-88-6 (in French)
- Mary, Jean-Yves; Hohnadel, Alain; Sicard, Jacques. Hommes et Ouvrages de la Ligne Maginot, Tome 5. Paris, Histoire & Collections, 2009. ISBN 978-2-35250-127-5 (in French)
