= Ouvrage Gordolon =

- Part of Maginot Line, Alpine Line
- Southeast France

Site information
- Controlled by: France

Location
- Coordinates: 43.99518°N 7.31091°E

Site history
- Built by: CORF
- In use: Abandoned
- Materials: Concrete, steel
- Battles/wars: Italian invasion of France, Operation Dragoon

Ouvrage Gordolon is a work (gros ouvrage) of the Maginot Line's Alpine extension, the Alpine Line, also known as the Little Maginot Line. The ouvrage consists of one and two infantry blocks at an altitude of 728 metres (2,388 ft). Gordolon was built by Borie contractors at a cost of 21.4 million francs. Work started in November 1931 and was completed in April 1934.

== Description ==
Ouvrage Gordolon was planned to control the road through Roquebilliėre in coordination with Ouvrage Flaut. Both ouvrages are unusual for the Alps in having anti-tank guns, which were more commonly used at the main Maginot Line, in the more favorable tank country of northeastern France. The compact plan was laid out on two levels, with a planned expansion of the barracks never carried out.

- Block 1 (entry): one machine gun cloche and one machine gun embrasure.
- Block 2 (infantry): one machine gun cloche, one twin heavy machine gun cloche, one grenade launcher cloche, one machine gun/47mm anti-tank gun embrasure and two 81mm mortar embrasures.
- Block 3 (infantry): one machine gun cloche, two twin heavy machine gun cloches, one observation cloche, two 75mm gun embrasures and two 81mm mortar embrasures.

A fourth block was planned as a casemate with two heavy machine gun embrasures, but not built. Two observation posts included the post at Pas d'Albéras.

== See also ==
- List of Alpine Line ouvrages

== Bibliography ==
- Allcorn, William. The Maginot Line 1928-45. Oxford: Osprey Publishing, 2003. ISBN 1-84176-646-1
- Kaufmann, J.E. and Kaufmann, H.W. Fortress France: The Maginot Line and French Defenses in World War II, Stackpole Books, 2006. ISBN 0-275-98345-5
- Kaufmann, J.E., Kaufmann, H.W., Jancovič-Potočnik, A. and Lang, P. The Maginot Line: History and Guide, Pen and Sword, 2011. ISBN 978-1-84884-068-3
- Mary, Jean-Yves; Hohnadel, Alain; Sicard, Jacques. Hommes et Ouvrages de la Ligne Maginot, Tome 1. Paris, Histoire & Collections, 2001. ISBN 2-908182-88-2 (in French)
- Mary, Jean-Yves; Hohnadel, Alain; Sicard, Jacques. Hommes et Ouvrages de la Ligne Maginot, Tome 4 - La fortification alpine. Paris, Histoire & Collections, 2009. ISBN 978-2-915239-46-1 (in French)
- Mary, Jean-Yves; Hohnadel, Alain; Sicard, Jacques. Hommes et Ouvrages de la Ligne Maginot, Tome 5. Paris, Histoire & Collections, 2009. ISBN 978-2-35250-127-5 (in French)
