= Ouvrage Roquebrune =

- Part of Maginot Line, Alpine Line
- Roquebrune

Site information
- Controlled by: France
- Open to the public: No

Location
- Coordinates: 43.76885°N 7.46624°E

Site history
- Built: 1931
- Built by: CORF
- In use: Municipal maintenance facility
- Materials: Concrete, steel, rock excavation
- Battles/wars: Italian invasion of France, Operation Dragoon

Ouvrage Roquebrune is a work (gros ouvrage) of the Maginot Line's Alpine extension, the Alpine Line. The ouvrage consists of one entry block, two artillery blocks and one observation block facing Italy. The fortification is located on the heights behind Roquebrune at an elevation of 321 meters overlooking Cap Martin and the bays of Roquebrune and Menton. The ouvrage was manned by 293 men of the 58th Demi-Brigade Alpin de Forteresse (DBAF), supported by the 157th Régiment d'Artillerie de Position (RAP), under the command of Captain Gayot.

== Description ==
The ouvrage was built between November 1931 and July 1933 by Thorrand et Cie., at a cost of 20.3 million francs.

- Block 1 (entry): Two FM embrasures, one machine gun cloche and one grenade launcher cloche.
- Block 2: (artillery block) two 75mm guns, two 81mm mortars, one machine gun cloche and one grenade launcher cloche.
- Block 3: (artillery block) two 75mm guns, two 81mm mortars, two machine gun cloches and one grenade launcher cloche.
- Block 4: one machine gun port, one machine gun/observation cloche and one grenade launcher cloche. The block provides emergency egress from the ouvrage.

Block D was unbuilt, planned for four 81mm mortars, and Block E, also unbuilt, was planned as an infantry block. The subterranean connecting galleries, ammunition magazines, usine and barracks are arranged in a branching pattern. Four observation posts are associated with Roquebrune, including the Abri Est de Mont-Gros and the Observatoire Croix-de-Muratoire.

Block 3 is essentially the same as the large artillery casemates built by CORF for the main Maginot line in northeastern France, with 75mm guns on the upper level and 81mm mortars firing upwards out of the pit in front of the guns. The block is sunk into the ground, compared to the more typical batteries in the Alps, which were usually built into the side of a cliff or rock wall. Block 2 fired 599 rounds of 75mm shells and 770 81mm mortar rounds in June 1940.

Roquebrune retains its peacetime barracks overlooking the Mediterranean. The barracks have recently been restored. The ouvrage is occupied by the maintenance department of the local parks and recreation authority. The interior is not accessible but is in good condition, while the exteriors of the blocks are easily accessible.

The observatory Mont-Gros de Roquebrune 43°45′58″N 7°26′35″E is an observation block intended to spot the fall of shot for Ouvrage Mont Agel, and is more closely associated with that fortification.

== See also ==
- List of Alpine Line ouvrages

== Bibliography ==
- Allcorn, William. The Maginot Line 1928-45. Oxford: Osprey Publishing, 2003. ISBN 1-84176-646-1
- Kaufmann, J.E. and Kaufmann, H.W. Fortress France: The Maginot Line and French Defenses in World War II, Stackpole Books, 2006. ISBN 0-275-98345-5
- Kaufmann, J.E., Kaufmann, H.W., Jancovič-Potočnik, A. and Lang, P. The Maginot Line: History and Guide, Pen and Sword, 2011. ISBN 978-1-84884-068-3
- Mary, Jean-Yves; Hohnadel, Alain; Sicard, Jacques. Hommes et Ouvrages de la Ligne Maginot, Tome 1. Paris, Histoire & Collections, 2001. ISBN 2-908182-88-2 (in French)
- Mary, Jean-Yves; Hohnadel, Alain; Sicard, Jacques. Hommes et Ouvrages de la Ligne Maginot, Tome 4 - La fortification alpine. Paris, Histoire & Collections, 2009. ISBN 978-2-915239-46-1 (in French)
- Mary, Jean-Yves; Hohnadel, Alain; Sicard, Jacques. Hommes et Ouvrages de la Ligne Maginot, Tome 5. Paris, Histoire & Collections, 2009. ISBN 978-2-35250-127-5 (in French)
