= Ouvrage Aumetz =

- Part of Maginot Line
- Northeast France

Site information
- Owner: Private
- Controlled by: France
- Condition: Abandoned

Location
- Coordinates: 49.41389°N 5.95917°E

Site history
- Built by: CORF
- Materials: Concrete, steel, deep excavation
- Battles/wars: Battle of France, Lorraine Campaign

Ouvrage Aumetz is a small work, or petit ouvrage of the Maginot Line. It is part of the Fortified Sector of the Crusnes and is located near the community of Aumetz in the Moselle département of France. The petit ouvrage flanked by the gros ouvrages Bréhain and Rochonvillers, all facing the France-Luxembourg border. Aumetz was initially planned as a gros ouvrage of six combat blocks, but only three infantry blocks were built. Aumetz saw limited action during the Battle of France. In the 1970s it was the first Maginot position to be offered for sale to the public.

== Design and construction ==
Aumetz was planned as part of the second series of Maginot fortifications, with planning beginning in 1930 and construction in 1931. Initially planned as a gros ouvrage with three infantry blocks and three artillery blocks, the project was scaled back to just the infantry blocks, with entry blocks and artillery to come at a later date. Construction cost was 9.5 million francs. The contractor was Verdun-Fortifications.

== Description ==
Aumetz is a compact ouvrage (Note: English-language sources use the French term ouvrage as the preferred term for the Maginot positions, in preference to "fort", a term usually reserved for older fortifications with passive defensives in the form of walls and ditches. The literal translation of ouvrage in the sense of a fortification in English is "work." A gros ouvrage is a large fortification with a significant artillery component, while a petit ouvrage is smaller, with lighter arms.) with three closely grouped infantry blocks with underground galleries converging on a central underground barracks. The entry is immediately behind the junction, with no special degree of fortification, as it was intended to be extended some hundreds of meters to the south in the second phase.

- Block 1: Entry block with one automatic rifle cloche (GFM) and one machine gun cloche (JM).
- Block 2: Infantry block with one machine gun turret and two GFM cloches.
- Block 3: Infantry block with one machine gun/anti-tank gun embrasure (JM/AC47), one machine gun embrasure (JM) and two GFM cloches.

Three additional blocks were planned for one 135mm and two 75mm retracting gun turrets, to be placed behind the infantry combat blocks as part of a compact ensemble of positions. A long gallery was planned to extend to the rear to open into a personnel entry and a munitions entry, with an underground barracks and a magazine. The completed gros ouvrage would have resembled its neighbor Bréhain.

=== Casemates and shelters ===
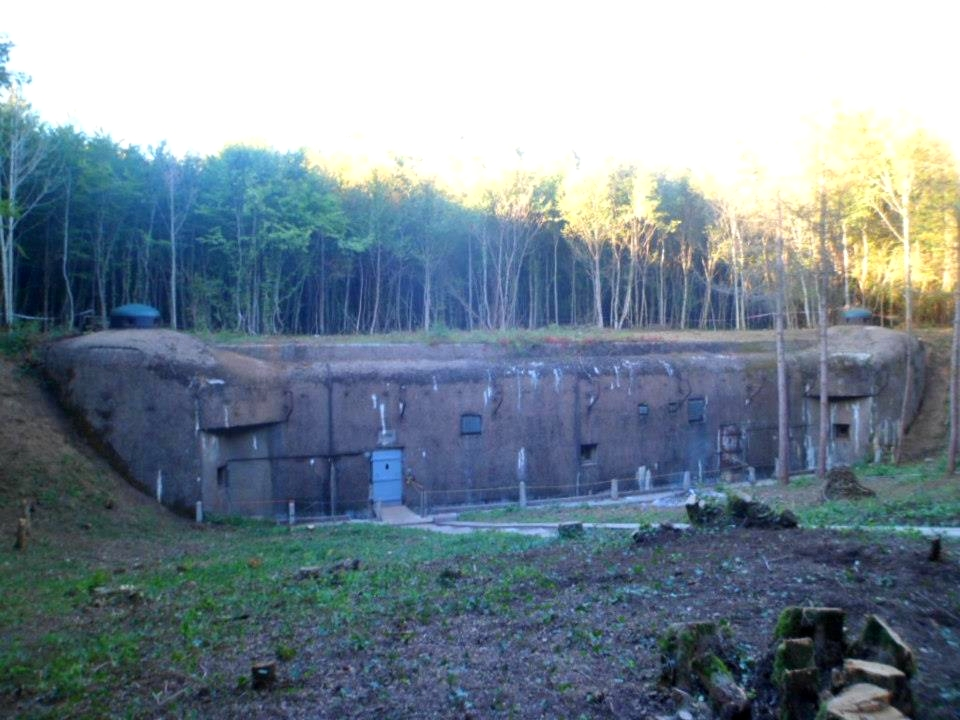
The Abri du Gros-Bois (X1)

A series of detached casemates and infantry shelters extend in the direction of Rochonvillers, including

- Casemate de Tressange: Single block with one JM/AC47 embrasure, one JM embrasure, one mortar turret and one GFM cloche.
- Casemate de Bure: Single block with one JM/AC47 embrasure, one JM embrasure, two mortar cloches and one GFM cloche.
- Casemate de la Fond-d'Havange: Single block with one JM/AC47 embrasure, one JM embrasure, one 50mm mortar embrasure on the lower level, oneo mortar cloche and two GFM cloches.
- Casemate du Gros-Bois: Single block with one JM/AC47 embrasure, one JM embrasure, one mortar cloche and one GFM cloche.
- Abri du Gros-Bois: (Note: An abri is an infantry shelter, sometimes underground or under earth cover. An abri in the main Maginot Line often closely resembles a casemate, but is more lightly armed and can hold more occupants.) Shelter for two infantry sections, two GFM cloches, sector command post.

None of these are connected to the ouvrage or to each other. The Casernement de Ludelange provided peacetime above-ground barracks and support services to Aumetz and other fortifications in the area.

== Manning ==
The 1940 manning of the ouvrage under the command of Lieutenant Braun comprised 112 men and 2 officers of the 128th Fortress Infantry Regiment. The units were under the umbrella of the 42nd Fortress Corps of the 3rd Army, Army Group 2.

== History ==
See Fortified Sector of the Crusnes for a broader discussion of the events of 1940 in the Crusnes sector of the Maginot Line.

Aumetz did not see significant action until June 1940, when German forces kept up a series of harassing attacks. On 19 June, the Germans set up a 37mm anti-tank gun on a mine spoil mound and opened fire against Block 3, without much effect. Bréhain's artillery replied with counter-battery fire. An advance along the nearby rail line was repelled with machine gun fire from Aumetz. Steady advances by the Germans isolated Aumetz by 23 June. The 22 June 1940 armistice brought an end to fighting. However, the Maginot fortifications to the west of the Moselle did not surrender immediately, maintaining their garrisons through a series of negotiations. Aumetz, along with Mauvais-Bois, Bois-du-Four and Bréhain surrendered on 27 June.

Aumetz appears to have been ignored by the Germans during the Occupation. With the 1944 advance of the American army through the area, the Americans used some of the ouvrages for experiments in tactics and weapons. The cloches of the Casemate du Gros Bois was used as firing targets and were pierced by artillery fire.

After the war, Aumetz remained government property. On 23 June 1970 Aumetz was the first Maginot ouvrage to be offered for sale to the public. The buyers stripped the position of all materials and equipment, leaving only bare concrete.

== See also ==
- List of all works on Maginot Line
- Siegfried Line
- Atlantic Wall
- Czechoslovak border fortifications

== Bibliography ==
- Allcorn, William. The Maginot Line 1928-45. Oxford: Osprey Publishing, 2003. ISBN 1-84176-646-1
- Kaufmann, J.E. and Kaufmann, H.W. Fortress France: The Maginot Line and French Defenses in World War II, Stackpole Books, 2006. ISBN 0-275-98345-5
- Kaufmann, J.E., Kaufmann, H.W., Jancovič-Potočnik, A. and Lang, P. The Maginot Line: History and Guide, Pen and Sword, 2011. ISBN 978-1-84884-068-3
- Mary, Jean-Yves; Hohnadel, Alain; Sicard, Jacques. Hommes et Ouvrages de la Ligne Maginot, Tome 1. Paris, Histoire & Collections, 2001. ISBN 2-908182-88-2 (in French)
- Mary, Jean-Yves; Hohnadel, Alain; Sicard, Jacques. Hommes et Ouvrages de la Ligne Maginot, Tome 2. Paris, Histoire & Collections, 2003. ISBN 2-908182-97-1 (in French)
- Mary, Jean-Yves; Hohnadel, Alain; Sicard, Jacques. Hommes et Ouvrages de la Ligne Maginot, Tome 3. Paris, Histoire & Collections, 2003. ISBN 2-913903-88-6 (in French)
- Mary, Jean-Yves; Hohnadel, Alain; Sicard, Jacques. Hommes et Ouvrages de la Ligne Maginot, Tome 5. Paris, Histoire & Collections, 2009. ISBN 978-2-35250-127-5 (in French)
