= Ouvrage Bousse =

Ouvrage of the Maginot Line

- Part of Maginot Line
- Northeast France

Site information
- Controlled by: France
- Open to the public: Yes

Location
- Coordinates: 49.25°N 6.43333°E

Site history
- Built by: CORF
- In use: Preserved
- Materials: Concrete, steel, deep excavation
- Battles/wars: Battle of France

Ouvrage Bousse, also known as Ouvrage Bois de Bousse, is a lesser work (petit ouvrage) of the Maginot Line in the Fortified Sector of Boulay. The ouvrage is located between petit ouvrage Hobling and gros ouvrage Anzeling, near Hestroff in the Bois du Bousse, facing Germany. A small position, it was manned primarily by reservists. It is noted for the events of 15 June 1940, when it received orders to prepare for an evacuation as German forces advanced along the Line in the Battle of France. As the garrison prepared to abandon the position, sabotaging equipment, they destroyed their telephone connection, leaving them unable to receive the order countermanding the evacuation. The garrison was captured three days after leaving Bousse. Bousse is now managed as a museum and is open to public visitation.

== Design and construction ==
Bousse was approved for construction by the Commission d'Organisation des Régions Fortifiées (CORF), the Maginot Line's design and construction agency, in 1930 and became operational by 1935, at a cost of 23 million francs. The contractor was Gianotti of Nice. Bousse was sited to control the Thionville-Hargarten and Metz-Bouzonville railroad lines. A planned block to cover the railroad cutting just beyond Block 1 was never built. It would have functioned much like a casemate in a counterscarp had it been built, with the cutting standing in for a traditional outer ditch.

== Description ==
Bousse is a petit ouvrage (Note: English-language sources use the French term ouvrage as the preferred term for the Maginot positions, in preference to "fort", a term usually reserved for older fortifications with passive defenses in the form of walls and ditches. The literal translation of ouvrage in the sense of a fortification in English is "work." A gros ouvrage is a large fortification with a significant artillery component, while a petit ouvrage is smaller, with lighter arms.) with three combat blocks and an entry block. The blocks are linked by an underground gallery with barracks and a utility area (usine). The galleries are excavated at an average depth of up to 30 metres (98 ft).

- Block 1: observation block with one observation cloche (VDP), one automatic rifle cloche (GFM).
- Block 2: Infantry casemate, flanking to the south — one machine gun/anti-tank gun embrasure (JM/AC47), two GFM cloches and one twin machine gun embrasure (JM).
- Block 3: Infantry casemate, flanking to the south one machine gun/anti-tank gun embrasure (JM/AC47), one machine gun embrasure (JM), two GFM cloches, one machine gun turret.
- Entry: one JM/AC47 embrasure, one grenade launcher cloche, one GFM cloche.

A planned Block 4, equipped with an 81mm mortar turret, was not built.

=== Casemates and shelters ===
In addition to the connected combat blocks, a series of detached casemates and infantry shelters surround Bousse, including

- Casemate d'Edling Nord: SIngle block with one JM/AC47 embrasure, one JM embrasure and one GFM cloche.
- Casemate d'Edling Sud: SIngle block with one JM/AC47 embrasure, one JM embrasure and one GFM cloche.
- Observatoire de Hestroff: SIngle block with VP cloche and one GFM cloche, reporting to Anzeling.
- Abri de Hestroff: Surface abri (Note: An abri is an infantry shelter, sometimes underground or under earth cover. An abri in the main Maginot Line often closely resembles a casemate, but is more lightly armed and can hold more occupants.) with two GFM cloches.
- Abri de Rotherberg: Subgrade abri-caverne with two GFM cloches.

== Manning ==
In June 1940 the garrison comprised 144 men and 5 officers of the 162nd Fortress Infantry Regiment (RIF). The commanding officer was Captain Ramaud. The Casernement de Bockange provided peacetime above-ground barracks and support services to Bousse and other positions in the area. The units were under the umbrella of the 3rd Army, Army Group 2.

== History ==
See Fortified Sector of Boulay for a broader discussion of the Boulay sector of the Maginot Line.

In June 1940, as German units bypassed Maginot fortifications to the east, French commanders ordered garrisons in the Boulay and Falquemont sectors to prepare for withdrawal to avoid their isolation by German units operating behind the lines. As it became clear that retreat was impractical, the orders were countermanded. A poorly understood telephone call from Ouvrage Anzeling on the 15th caused the reservists manning Bousse to evacuate the position between 1600 and 2100 hours. Before departing they sabotaged their equipment, including their telephone switchboard, preventing them from receiving the counter-order to remain in place. After three days' march, the garrison was captured at Pange near Metz on the 18th. Block 2 was damaged by covering fire from its neighbor, ouvrage Aumetz, a unique occurrence.

Bousse played no significant role in the Lorraine Campaign of 1944. After the Second World War it became part of the Mòle de Boulay, a strongpoint in the northeastern defenses against Soviet attack. Bousse remained under Army control until after 1971, when it was declassified and sold.

== Current condition ==
Ouvrage Bousse is under the care of a preservation society, the Association Fort aux Fresques, which organizes tours for the public. The association is named for the well-preserved frescos or wall paintings found within the ouvrage.

== See also ==
- List of all works on Maginot Line
- Siegfried Line
- Atlantic Wall
- Czechoslovak border fortifications

== Bibliography ==
- Allcorn, William. The Maginot Line 1928-45. Oxford: Osprey Publishing, 2003. ISBN 1-84176-646-1
- Degon, André; Zylberyng, Didier, La Ligne Maginot: Guide des Forts à Visiter, Editions Ouest-France, 2014. ISBN 978-2-7373-6080-0 (in French)
- Kaufmann, J.E. and Kaufmann, H.W. Fortress France: The Maginot Line and French Defenses in World War II, Stackpole Books, 2006. ISBN 0-275-98345-5
- Kaufmann, J.E., Kaufmann, H.W., Jancovič-Potočnik, A. and Lang, P. The Maginot Line: History and Guide, Pen and Sword, 2011. ISBN 978-1-84884-068-3
- Mary, Jean-Yves; Hohnadel, Alain; Sicard, Jacques. Hommes et Ouvrages de la Ligne Maginot, Tome 1. Paris, Histoire & Collections, 2001. ISBN 2-908182-88-2 (in French)
- Mary, Jean-Yves; Hohnadel, Alain; Sicard, Jacques. Hommes et Ouvrages de la Ligne Maginot, Tome 2. Paris, Histoire & Collections, 2003. ISBN 2-908182-97-1 (in French)
- Mary, Jean-Yves; Hohnadel, Alain; Sicard, Jacques. Hommes et Ouvrages de la Ligne Maginot, Tome 3. Paris, Histoire & Collections, 2003. ISBN 2-913903-88-6 (in French)
- Mary, Jean-Yves; Hohnadel, Alain; Sicard, Jacques. Hommes et Ouvrages de la Ligne Maginot, Tome 5. Paris, Histoire & Collections, 2009. ISBN 978-2-35250-127-5 (in French)
