= Ouvrage Hobling =

Lesser work of the Maginot Line

- Part of Maginot Line
- Northeast France
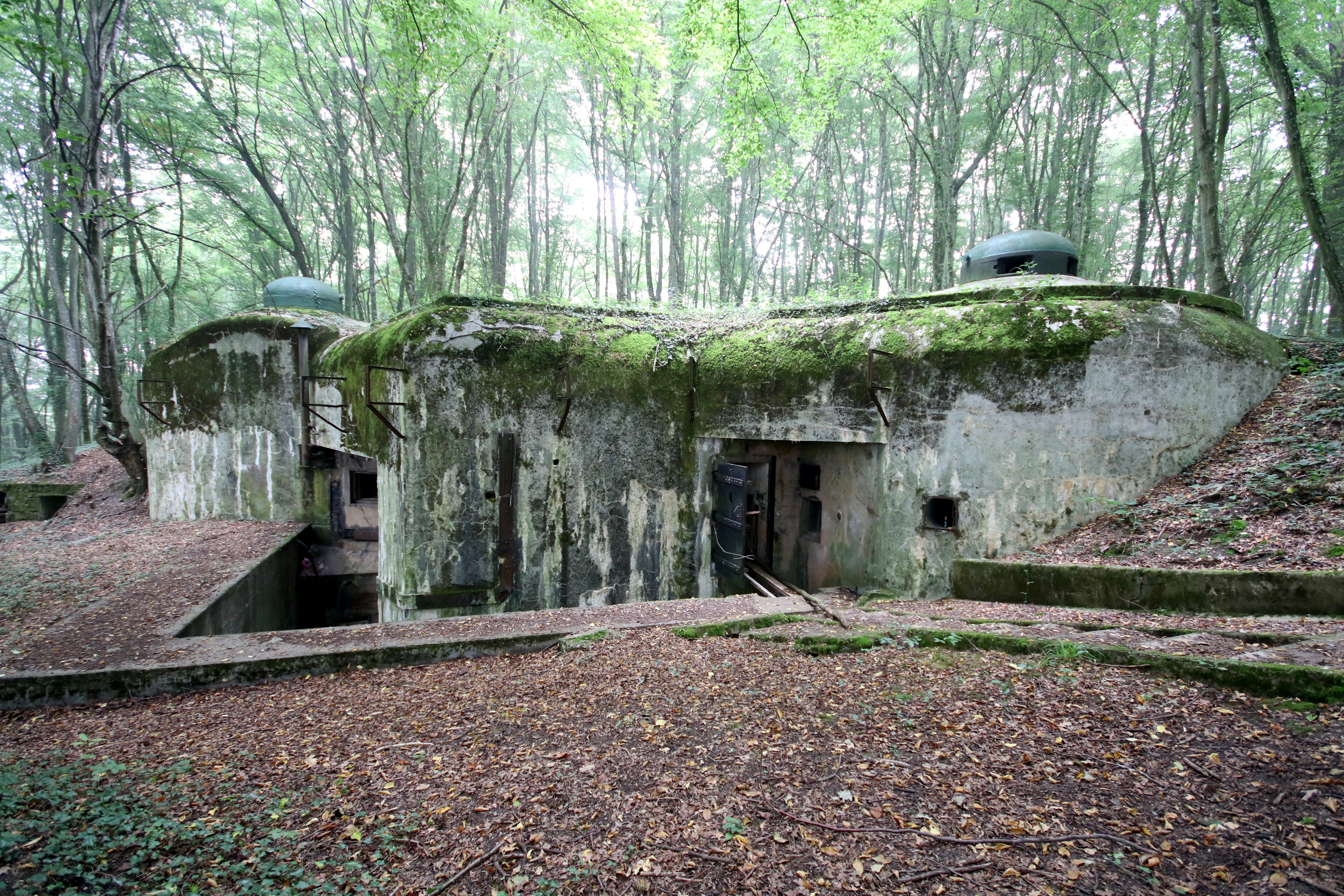

Site information
- Controlled by: France

Location
- Coordinates: 49.28333°N 6.41667°E

Site history
- In use: Abandoned
- Materials: Concrete, steel, deep excavation
- Battles/wars: Battle of France

Ouvrage Hobling is a lesser work (petit ouvrage) of the Maginot Line. Located in the Fortified Sector of Boulay, the ouvrage consists of two infantry blocks and two observation blocks, and is located between gros ouvrage Michelsberg and petit ouvrage Bousse, facing Germany. It has been stripped of metals and abandoned.

== Design and construction ==
Hobling was approved for construction by CORF (Commission d'Organisation des Régions Fortifiées), the Maginot Line's design and construction agency, in 1931 and became operational by 1935, at a cost of 14 million francs. The contractor was Gianotti of Nice.

== Description ==
Hobling is a petit ouvrage (Note: English-language sources use the French term ouvrage as the preferred term for the Maginot positions, in preference to "fort", a term usually reserved for older fortifications with passive defenses in the form of walls and ditches. The literal translation of ouvrage in the sense of a fortification in English is "work." A gros ouvrage is a large fortification with a significant artillery component, while a petit ouvrage is smaller, with lighter arms.) with four combat blocks. The blocks are linked by an underground gallery with barracks and a utility area (usine). The galleries are excavated at an average depth of up to 30 metres (98 ft).

- Block 1: infantry block with two automatic rifle cloches (GFM)andone twin machine gun embrasure.
- Block 2: infantry/entry block with two GFM cloches, one twin machine gun embrasure and one 47mm anti-tank gun (JM/AC47) embrasure.
- Block 3: infantry block with one GFM cloche and one retractable twin machine gun turret.
- Block 4: observation block with one observation cloche (VDP) and one automatic rifle embrasure.

A planned Block 5, equipped with an 81mm mortar turret, and an entry block at the end of a gallery of about 200 metres (660 ft) were not built.

=== Casemates and shelters ===
In addition to the connected combat blocks, a series of detached casemates and infantry shelters surround Hobling, including

- Abri d'Ising: Surface infantry shelter (abri) (Note: An abri is an infantry shelter, sometimes underground or under earth cover. An abri in the main Maginot Line often closely resembles a casemate, but is more lightly armed and can hold more occupants.) with two GFM cloches.
- Abri de Férange: Sub-grade abri-caverne with two GFM cloches.

== Manning ==
In June 1940 the garrison comprised 115 men and 4 officers of the 164th Fortress Infantry Regiment (RIF). The commanding officer was Captain Boileau. The Casernement de Férange provided peacetime above-ground barracks and support services to Hobling and other positions in the area. The units were under the umbrella of the 3rd Army, Army Group 2.

== History ==
See Fortified Sector of Boulay for a broader discussion of the Boulay sector of the Maginot Line.

Hobling played no significant role in either the Battle of France in 1940 or the Lorraine Campaign of 1944. After the Second World War it became part of the Mòle de Boulay, a strongpoint in the northeastern defenses against Soviet attack. Hobling remained under Army control until after 1971, when it was declassified and sold.

== Current condition ==
Sold in 1975, Hobling has been partially stripped by salvagers and is abandoned. The salvage work stopped with the removal of all metals, including cloches and turrets, from two blocks. Hobling was the last ouvrage to be stripped.

== See also ==
- List of all works on Maginot Line
- Siegfried Line
- Atlantic Wall
- Czechoslovak border fortifications

== Bibliography ==
- Allcorn, William. The Maginot Line 1928-45. Oxford: Osprey Publishing, 2003. ISBN 1-84176-646-1
- Kaufmann, J.E. and Kaufmann, H.W. Fortress France: The Maginot Line and French Defenses in World War II, Stackpole Books, 2006. ISBN 0-275-98345-5
- Kaufmann, J.E., Kaufmann, H.W., Jancovič-Potočnik, A. and Lang, P. The Maginot Line: History and Guide, Pen and Sword, 2011. ISBN 978-1-84884-068-3
- Mary, Jean-Yves; Hohnadel, Alain; Sicard, Jacques. Hommes et Ouvrages de la Ligne Maginot, Tome 1. Paris, Histoire & Collections, 2001. ISBN 2-908182-88-2 (in French)
- Mary, Jean-Yves; Hohnadel, Alain; Sicard, Jacques. Hommes et Ouvrages de la Ligne Maginot, Tome 2. Paris, Histoire & Collections, 2003. ISBN 2-908182-97-1 (in French)
- Mary, Jean-Yves; Hohnadel, Alain; Sicard, Jacques. Hommes et Ouvrages de la Ligne Maginot, Tome 3. Paris, Histoire & Collections, 2003. ISBN 2-913903-88-6 (in French)
- Mary, Jean-Yves; Hohnadel, Alain; Sicard, Jacques. Hommes et Ouvrages de la Ligne Maginot, Tome 5. Paris, Histoire & Collections, 2009. ISBN 978-2-35250-127-5 (in French)
