= Gaston Renondeau =

French translator and writer (1879–1967)

- Born: 10 September 1879; France
- Died: November 25, 1967 (aged 88)
- Occupations: French military general, writer, translator

Gaston Renondeau (10 September 1879 – 25 November 1967) was a French translator and writer. He was also a French military officer, reaching the rank of division general in 1936.

== Biography ==
=== Military career ===
Gaston-Ernest Renondeau entered the École Polytechnique before entering the military career as an artillery officer. In 1920, he served as the French military attache to the French mission in Japan. He obtained the rank of captain, and became brigadier general in 1932; division general in 1936. He was assigned as the French military attaché in Berlin from 1932 to 1938. This was considered the most important and prestigious of the attache posts. His accounts during this period included reports detailing Adolf Hitler's preparations to build the largest military force in Europe to achieve German hegemony in the region. This included evidence sent to France that Germany was making arrangements for a long military conflict.

In 1942, he commanded the 42nd Army Corps of the 3rd Army.

=== Translation career ===
Trainee in the Japanese army, from 1909 to 1913, and military attaché in Tokyo from 1923 to 1928, Gaston Renondeau became familiar with the Japanese language and undertook the translation of classic texts, poetic anthologies and Noh plays from 1926.

His translations of Japanese literature are authoritative. However, his habit of signing only "G. Renondeau" sometimes made him rename "Georges" in some articles devoted to him.

== Works ==
=== General works and anthologies ===
- Gaston Renondeau, Histoire des moines guerriers au Japon, 1957, PUF,
- Gaston Renondeau, La doctrine de Nichiren, 1953, PUF,
- Gaston Renondeau, Nô, Premier et deuxième fascicules, 1953, Maison Franco-japonaise

=== Collective work ===
- Gaston Renondeau, L'influence bouddhique sur les Nô, in Les Théâtres d'Asie, Éditions du Centre national de la recherche scientifique, 1961

=== Translations ===
- Osamu Dazai: La déchéance d'un homme
- Ise monogatari. Connaissance de l’Orient. Gallimard/UNESCO. 1969. ISBN 2-07-071475-6.,
- Anthologie de la poésie japonaise classique. Paris: Éditions Gallimard. 1971. ISBN 2-07-032177-0.
- Yukio Mishima: The Sailor Who Fell from Grace with the Sea, Paris, Gallimard, series. "Folio, le livre de poche", 1979 (ISBN 978-2-07-037147-1)
