= Fortified Sector of the Crusnes =

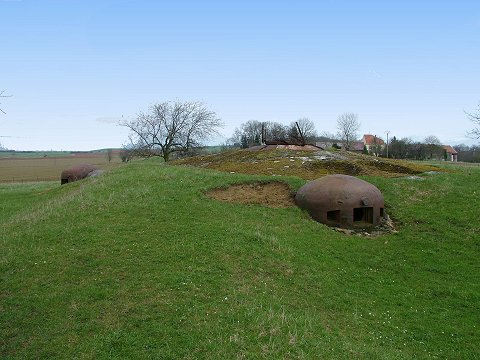
Block 2, Ferme Chappy

The Fortified Sector of the Crusnes (Secteur Fortifiée de la Crusnes) was the French military organization that in 1940 controlled the section of the Maginot Line extending eastwards approximately 28 kilometres (17 mi) from Longuyon. The sector roughly follows the valley of the Crusnes river. Crucially, the trace of the Maginot Line in the Crusnes sector is about 7 kilometres (4.3 mi) behind the industrial city of Longwy which sits directly against the French borders with Belgium and Luxembourg. The Crusnes sector was one of the strongest Maginot Line sectors. It was attacked in 1940 by German forces in the Battle of France. Despite the withdrawal of the mobile forces that supported the fixed fortifications, the sector successfully fended off German assaults before the Second Armistice at Compiègne. The positions and their garrisons finally surrendered on 27 June 1940. Following the war many positions were reactivated for use during the Cold War. Three locations are now preserved and open to the public, with a fourth position under restoration.

== Concept and organization ==
The sector was originally planned to protect Longwy, with a pronounced bow to the north comprising seven ouvrages replacing all but Bréhain. In order from west to east, these were to be the Ouvrage du Bois de Piepe, Ouvrage de Villers-la-Chévre, Ouvrage de Soxey, Ouvrage de la Rédoute, Ouvrage de Longwy, Ouvrage de Ratentout and the Ouvrage de Verbusch. This line was proposed on 24 June 1930, but was replaced by the more southerly line on 2 August 1930. The main line of fortifications would have been within one or two kilometres of the frontier, much farther forward than any other place on the Line, and in contradiction to the Maginot Line's concept of defense in depth. Construction began in most places in 1930, and was largely complete by 1935. Several locations had additional phases planned. Petit ouvrages Aumetz, Bois-du-Four and Mauvais-Bois were all planned to be expanded into gros ouvrages after completion of the initial plan. Other planned but unconstructed ouvrages included the Ouvrage de Bouillon and the Ouvrage de la Cote 143 (Hill 143), casualties of realignment. The Ouvrage de Rafour was planned to anchor the west end of the line behind Longuyon, but was canceled and replaced by a series of blockhouses as a cost-saving measure.

The Crusnes sector was part of the larger Fortified Region of Metz, a strongly defended area between the Ardennes to the west and the Sarre valley to the east. The Metz region was more important during the planning and construction phase of the Maginot Line than it was in the operational phase of the Line, when the sectors assumed prominence. The Fortified Region of Metz was dissolved as a military organization on 18 March 1940. The SF (Secteur Fortifiée) Crusnes was itself dissolved in 1940, becoming the 42nd Fortress Corps (42e Corps d'Armee de Forteresse (CAF)).

Insignia of the 128th RIF.

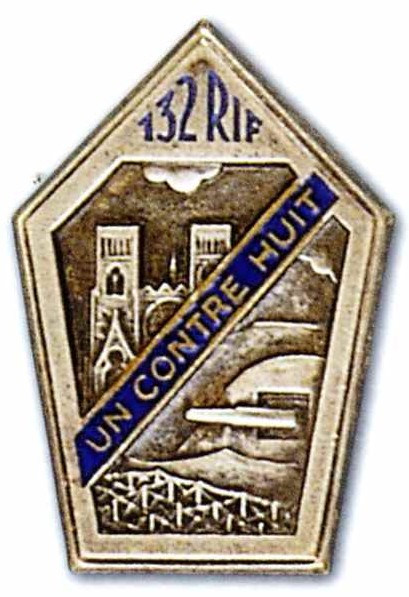
Insignia of the 132nd RIF.

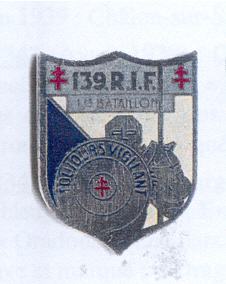
Insignia of the 139th RIF.

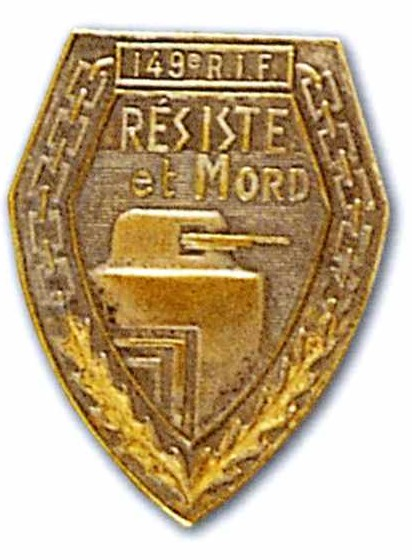
Insignia of the 149th RIF.

== Command ==
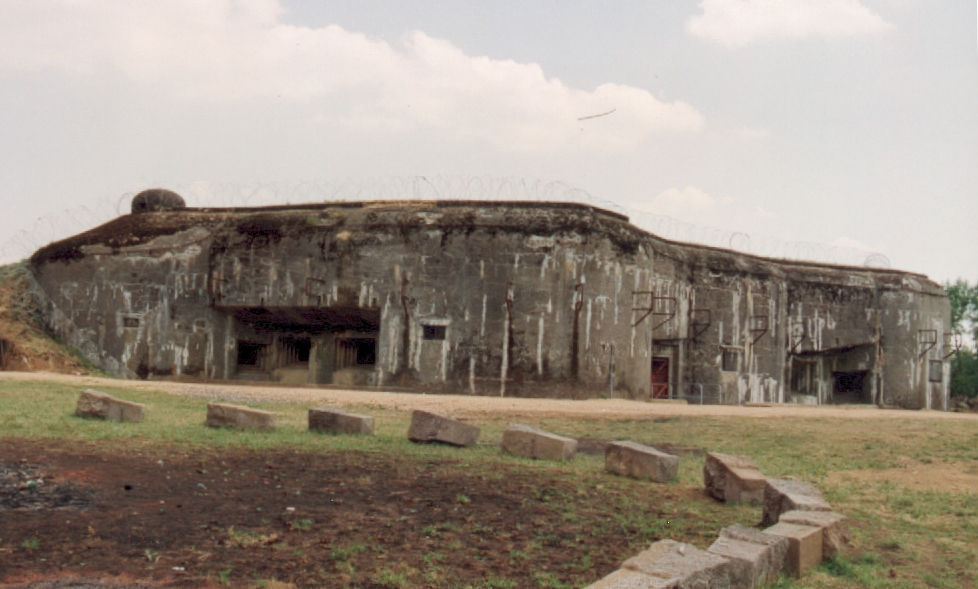
Bois-du-Four

The Crusnes sector was under the overall command of the French 3rd Army, headquartered at Fort Jeanne d'Arc at Metz, under the command of General Charles Condé, which was in turn part of Army Group 2 under General André-Gaston Prételat. The 42nd CAF was commanded by General de division Désiré Sivot from August 21, 1939, then General Gaston Renondeau from 27 May 1940. As the SF Crusnes, it was commanded by Colonel Miserey from 15 September 1939. The command post was at Briey. The interval troops, the army formations that were to provide the mobile defense for the sector, to support and be supported by the fixed defenses, were under the command of the 24th Corps (24e Corps d'Armee), General Fougère, commander. The 24th Corps was in turn made up of the 20th, 51st and 58th Infantry Divisions. Artillery support for the sector was provided by the 152nd Position Artillery Regiment (Régiment d'Artillerie de Position (RAP)), which controlled both fixed and mobile artillery, commanded by Lt. Colonel Jacob. The 20th Infantry Division was made up of Class A reservists, while the 51st and 58th IDs were Class B reserve formations, not considered suitable for significant combat.

== Description ==
The sector includes, in order from west to east, the following major fortified positions, together with the most significant casemates and infantry shelters in each sub-sector: (Note: English-language sources use the French term ouvrage as the preferred term for the Maginot positions, in preference to "fort", a term usually reserved for older fortifications with passive defenses in the form of walls and ditches. The literal translation of ouvrage in the sense of a fortification in English is "work." A gros ouvrage is a large fortification with a significant artillery component, while a petit ouvrage is smaller, with lighter arms.)

=== Subsector of Arrancy ===
149th Fortress Infantry Regiment (149e Régiment d'Infanterie de Forteresse (RIF)), Lt. Colonel Beaupuis, command post at Calvaire d'Arrancy

- Ouvrage Ferme Chappy, petit ouvrage A1 of two combat blocks
- Ouvrage Fermont, gros ouvrage A2 of seven combat blocks and two entry blocks
- Ouvrage Latiremont, gros ouvrage A3 of six combat blocks and two entry blocks
- Casemate de Puxieux, C1
- Observatoire de Puxieux, O2
- Casemate du Bois-de-Beuveille, C2
- Observatiore de l'Haut-de-l'Anguille, O4
- Casemate du Haut-de-l'Anguille Ouest, C3
- Casemate du Haut-de-l'Anguille Est, C4
- Casemate du Bois-de-Tappe Ouest, C5
- Casemate du Bois-de-Tappe Est, C6
- Casemate de l'Ermitage Saint-Quentin, C7
- Casemate de Pracourt, C8
- Casemate de Jalaumont Ouest, C9

Peacetime barracks and support, in addition to a caserne at Longwy:

- Caserne Lamy (Longuyon)
- Casernement de Doncourt

=== Sub-sector of Morfortaine ===
139th Fortress Infantry Regiment (139e Régiment d'Infanterie de Forteresse (RIF)), Colonel Ritter, command post at Ville-au-Montois

- Ouvrage Mauvais-Bois, petit ouvrage A4 of three combat blocks
- Ouvrage Bois-du-Four, petit ouvrage A5 with a single combat block and no underground passages
- Casemate de Jalaumont Est, C10
- Observatiore de Haut-de-la-Vigne, O7
- Casemate de Chénières Ouest, C11
- Casemate de Chénières Est, C12
- Casemate de Laix, C13
- Casemate de Morfontaine, C14
- Casemate de Villiers-la-Montagne Ouest, C15
- Observatiore de Villiers-la-Montagne Centre, C16
- Casemate de Villiers-la-Montagne Est, C17
- Casemate de Verbusch Ouest, C18
- Casemate de Verbusch Est, C19
- Observatoire de la Ferme du Bois-du-Four, O 10
- Casemate de la Ferme Thiéry, C20
- Casemate de Bourène Ouest, C21
- Casemate de Bourène Est, C22

Peacetime barracks and support:

- Casernement de Morfortaine

=== Sub-sector of Aumetz ===
128th Fortress Infantry Regiment (128e Régiment d'Infanterie de Forteresse (RIF)), Colonel Roulin, command post at Serrouville

- Ouvrage Bréhain, gros ouvrage A6 of eight combat blocks and two entry blocks
- Ouvrage Aumetz, petit ouvrage A7 of three combat blocks
- Casemate de l'Ouest de Bréhain, C2, planned to be linked to Bréhain as Block 10
- Casemate de la Ravin-de-Crusnes, C23
- Casemate de Crusnes Ouest, C24
- Casemate de Crusnes Est, C25
- Casemate de Nouveau-Crusnes Ouest, C26
- Casemate de Nouveau-Crusnes Est, C27
- Casemate du Réservoir, C28
- Casemate de la Route d'Ottange Ouest, C29
- Casemate de la Route d'Ottange Centre, C30
- Casemate de la Route d'Ottange Ouest, C31
- Observatiore du Réservoir, O1
- Casemate de Tressange, C32
- Casemate de Bure, C33
- Casemate de la Fond-d'Havange, C34
- Casemate du Gros-Bois, C35
- Abri du Gros-Bois, X1 (Note: An abri is an infantry shelter, sometimes underground or under earth cover. An abri in the main Maginot Line often closely resembles a casemate, but is more lightly armed and can hold more occupants.)

Peacetime barracks and support:

- Casernement d'Errouville
- Casernement de Ludelange

=== Other units ===
On 10 May 1940, under the command of General de division Désiré Sivot, with his headquarters at Briey, the 42nd Fortress Army Corps comprised the following:

- 128th Line Infantry Regiment (3 machine-gun battalions)
- 139th Line Infantry Regiment (3 machine-gun battalions)
- 142nd Engineer Regiment (1st and 2nd Companies, Bridging Company 142/16)
- 46th Artillery Regiment
- 42nd Artillery Parc (repair and ammunition depot)
- Groupe Aérien d'Observation 506 (G.A.O. 506)
- And all support services (telegraph company, radio company, motor transport company, medical unit, meat supply company, supply unit, etc.).

Attached units on that day included the 20th Infantry Division (France); 58th Infantry Division (France); the 179e Bataillon du Génie (179th Engineer Battalion); 143rd Artillery Regiment (France) (143e RA); and I Battalion, 374th Artillery Regiment (I/374e RA).

== History ==
=== Battle of France ===
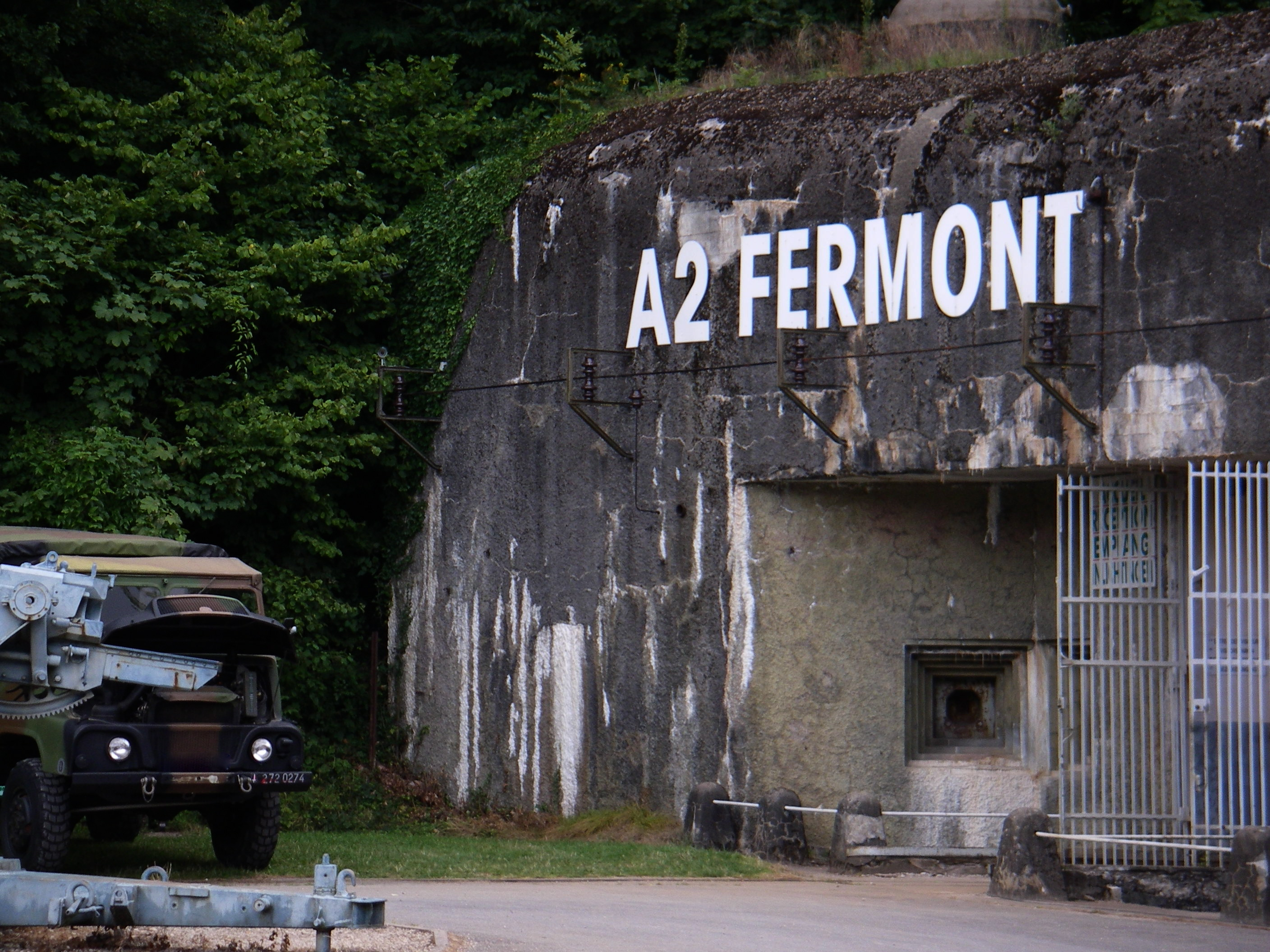
Fermont entrance

In February 1940 General Condé decided to protect the exposed city of Longwy, forming the Position Avancée de Longwy (PAL), using a combination of hastily built blockhouses and field units. A series of anti-tank obstacles were built between Longwy and the border, defended by elements of the 58th and 51st Infantry Divisions. Artillery cover was provided by the 75mm gun turret of Ouvrage Fermont, which could cover all of the area except Longwy itself. Two 75mm gun casemates were built between Mexy and Haucourt to cover this gap.

Troops of the German 17th Infantry Division attacked the Longwy position beginning 11 May 1940. The Germans quickly surrounded the city, with German forces in view of the main Maginot Line. The situation declined over the next two days, the reserve divisions performing poorly, and on the 13th General Condé ordered the evacuation of the PAL. The French 3rd Light Cavalry Division (3e Division Légère de Cavalerie (DLC)) advanced into Luxembourg in an attempt to spoil the attack before it was ordered back to French territory. The division, composed of one motorized regiment and two of horse, attempted to disrupt the German advance into the Longwy salient, but did not attack in sufficient concentration to accomplish much. Condé was content to reorganize behind the Maginot Line. His passivity has been criticized; the abandonment of Longwy presented a missed opportunity for a counterattack by French forces.

By June, faced with the progressive collapse of the French First Army to the west, the interval troops began to pull back to avoid being encircled behind the Maginot Line. Measure A, issued by 3rd Army headquarters, called for the withdrawal of the interval troops on 15 June, protected by the casemates and ouvrages. Measure B was the withdrawal of artillery forces from the intervals late that day and into the 16th, protected by the ouvrages. Measure C was the withdrawal of all but skeleton forces from the fortifications. The forces left behind were to withdraw themselves by the 18th after sabotaging all equipment and weapons. As the withdrawal was developing, the Germans planned to pierce the Line between Mauvais-Bois and Bois-du-Four on the 14th, but called off the operation. At the same time, the garrisons of the Fortified Sector of Montmédy evacuated ahead of schedule, leaving the Crusnes sector's western flank exposed.

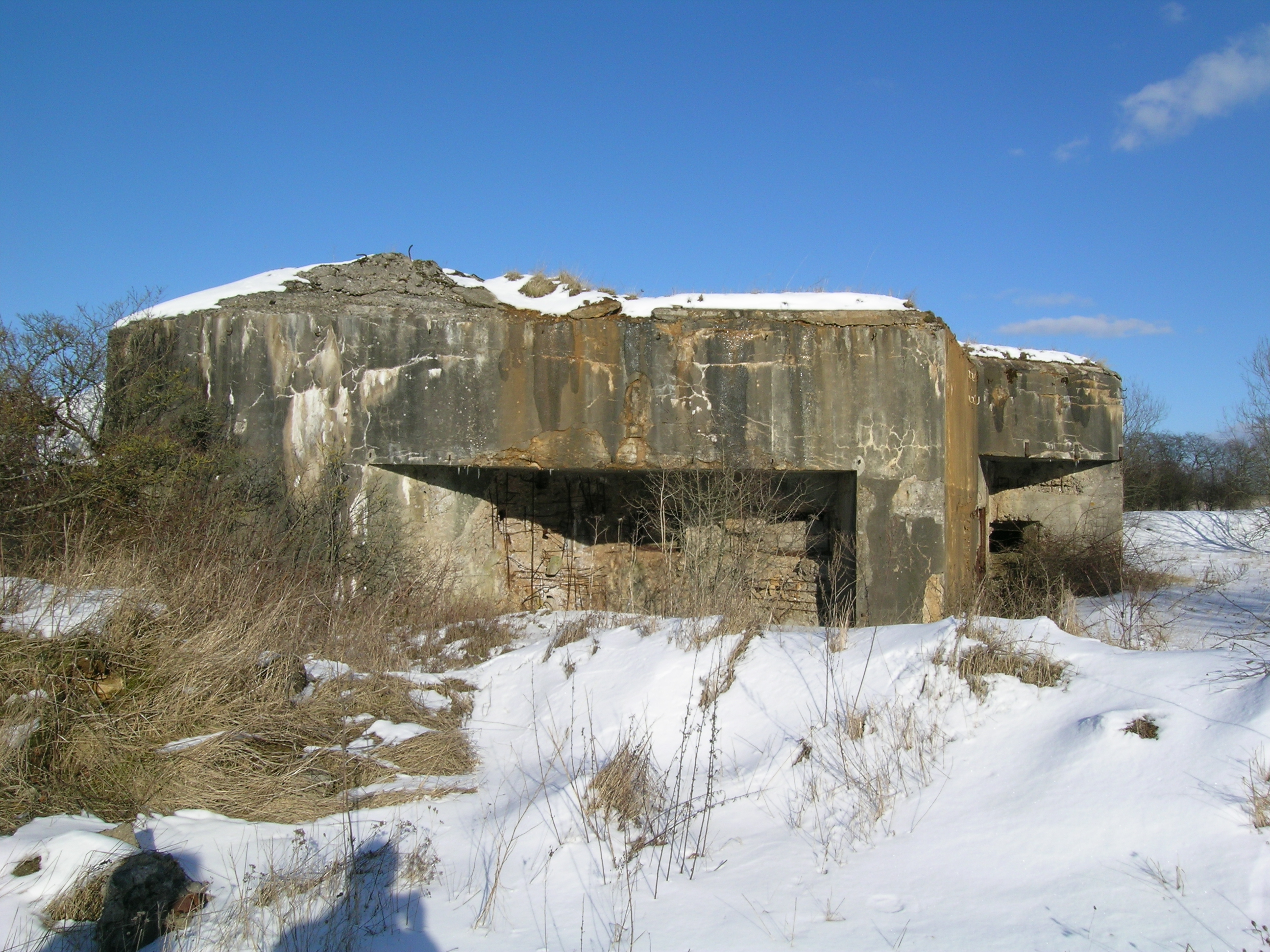
Casemate Ravin de Crusnes C23

Ouvrage Ferme Chappy, a two-block petit ouvrage, was now the westernmost extant outpost of the Maginot Line. While it was not in itself strong, it was well within the ranges of the guns of Fermont and Latiremont. Although the interval troops had escaped, by the 17th the Crusnes sector had been enveloped by the Germans from the east and west. Retreat was impossible. Through the day on 17 June, two 8.89cm anti-tank guns of the German 183rd Infantry Division fired at Fermont's Block 4, breaching it after 160 rounds, but stopping, unaware that they had nearly succeeded in knocking out the position. The damage was repaired overnight. The German 161st Infantry Division took over the next day. Under the impression that morale in the ouvrages was low, the division's commander, Lieutenant General Hermann Wilck ordered an attack on Ferme-Chappy and Fermont for 21 June. The assaults failed under fire from the two ouvrages and supporting fire from Latiremont. Casualties were 46 German dead and 251 wounded, with two French dead, one each at Fermont and Ferme-Chappy. The Germans were allowed to retrieve their dead and wounded under a flag of truce. An assault against Latiremont was canceled when the army group commander, General Wilhelm Ritter von Leeb ordered all attacks against Maginot fortifications to stop, as a waste of resources. Action between the 21st and the date of the June 25 armistice was limited to sporadic shelling and, on the French side, to firing off ammunition at the Germans before it could be captured.

Other German formations carried out harassing attacks on Aumetz and Bréhain, as well as on individual casemates. Moving behind the French lines, the Germans were able to cut telephone lines at easily identifiable junctions, leaving the ouvrages to radio communications. Following the armistice, brief negotiations settled on a formal surrender for the Crusnes garrisons on 27 June. On the morning of the 27th, the French forces marched out of their positions and returned to their peacetime barracks at Doncourt, Morfontaine and Errouville. All positions were left intact for the Germans, with the exception of Aumetz, sabotaged at the order of its commander, Lieutenant Braun.

In 1941 Fermont, along with positions in other sectors, was used to produce a propaganda film about the fall of the Maginot Line to the Germans. Bombardments were staged to make it look like the gros ouvrage had fallen. In reality, no gros ouvrage was captured by German attack.

=== Môle de Crusnes ===
Following World War II, the French military reclaimed the Maginot Line with the aim of renovating and improving it against a possible attack by Warsaw Pact forces. The strongest positions, Fermont and Latiremont, were designated the môle de Crusnes ("breakwater") in 1951 and were placed back into service after a period of rehabilitation. Bréhain received much the same treatment, but was attached to the môle de Rochonvillers farther east. Lesser positions, such as Mauvais-Bois, Bois-du-Four and Aumetz, were repaired and kept as government property, but were not formally designated as places of defense. After the establishment of the French nuclear strike force, the importance of the Line declined, and maintenance ceased in the 1970s, with most of the casemates and petit ouvrages sold to the public.

== Present status ==
Fermont, Bois-du-Four and Casemate C2 of Bréhain are operated as museums and are open to the public. The remainder are either privately owned or are military property, abandoned and sealed. The Casemate de Morfortaine may be visited by arrangement with the owner, who seeks to restore it.

== Bibliography ==
- Serge Andolenko, Collection of Histories of the French Infantry, Eurimprim, 1969.
- Allcorn, William. The Maginot Line 1928-45. Oxford: Osprey Publishing, 2003. ISBN 1-84176-646-1
- Degon, André; Zylberyng, Didier, La Ligne Maginot: Guide des Forts à Visiter, Editions Ouest-France, 2014. ISBN 978-2-7373-6080-0 (in French)
- Kaufmann, J.E. and Kaufmann, H.W. Fortress France: The Maginot Line and French Defenses in World War II, Stackpole Books, 2006. ISBN 0-275-98345-5
- Kaufmann, J.E., Kaufmann, H.W., Jancovič-Potočnik, A. and Lang, P. The Maginot Line: History and Guide, Pen and Sword, 2011. ISBN 978-1-84884-068-3
- Leulliot, Nowfel. "3e Armée Order of Battle / Ordre de bataille, May 10, 1940". France 1940. Leulliot drew directly on SHAT 1967.
- Mary, Jean-Yves; Hohnadel, Alain; Sicard, Jacques. Hommes et Ouvrages de la Ligne Maginot, Tome 1. Paris, Histoire & Collections, 2001. ISBN 2-908182-88-2 (in French)
- Mary, Jean-Yves; Hohnadel, Alain; Sicard, Jacques. Hommes et Ouvrages de la Ligne Maginot, Tome 3. Paris, Histoire & Collections, 2003. ISBN 2-913903-88-6 (in French)
- Mary, Jean-Yves; Hohnadel, Alain; Sicard, Jacques. Hommes et Ouvrages de la Ligne Maginot, Tome 5. Paris, Histoire & Collections, 2009. ISBN 978-2-35250-127-5 (in French)
- Romanych, Marc; Rupp, Martin. Maginot Line 1940: Battles on the French Frontier. Oxford: Osprey Publishing, 2010. ISBN 1-84176-646-1
- Service Historique de l'Armée de Terre, Les Grandes Unités Françaises de la Guerre 1939-1945, Historiques Succincts, collective work by the Service Historique de l'Armée de Terre, Vincennes : SHAT, 1967
