= LG cloche =

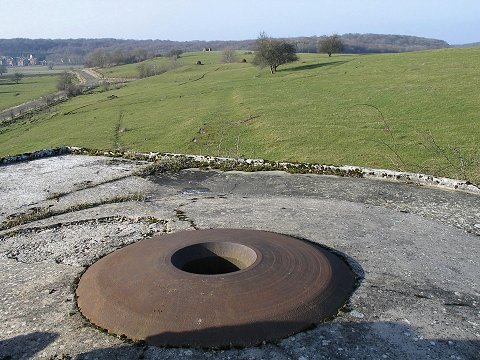
An LG grenade launcher cloche

The LG cloche was a defensive element common to many Maginot Line ouvrages. The fixed cupola was deeply embedded into the concrete on top of a combat block, with only the top surface visible. The opening permitted the ejection of grenades from the interior of the cloche, providing a means of close defense against enemy troops on top of the bunker. 75 units were installed in the Maginot Line.

LG refers to Lance-Grenade (grenade launcher). Unlike other cloches such as the GFM or the JM, the LG cloche was effectively "blind", possessing a single shuttered orifice 60 millimetres (2.4 in) in diameter in its flat crown. It had no observation ports at all, as it did not project appreciably above the surrounding surface. The LG cloche came in three models: a small version, 1.3 metres (4.3 ft) high, a large 2.1-metre (6.9 ft) version, and a cloche for two persons, 2.2 metres (7.2 ft) tall. All were 1.9 metres (6.2 ft) in diameter. LG cloches were usually found in the vicinity of an entrance block.

The LG cloche was armed with a grenade launcher that could fire at an angle from 45 degrees to vertical in all directions. The original 60mm mortar/launcher was not satisfactory. A 50mm mortar, the same used in the GFM cloche, was used as a replacement, but was not much more successful.

== See also ==
- VDP cloche, observation cloche

== Bibliography ==
- Mary, Jean-Yves; Hohnadel, Alain; Sicard, Jacques. Hommes et Ouvrages de la Ligne Maginot, Tome 2. Paris, Histoire & Collections, 2001. ISBN 2-908182-97-1 (in French)
