= Lorraine campaign =

US Army campaign in World War 2

- Part of the Siegfried Line campaign, World War II
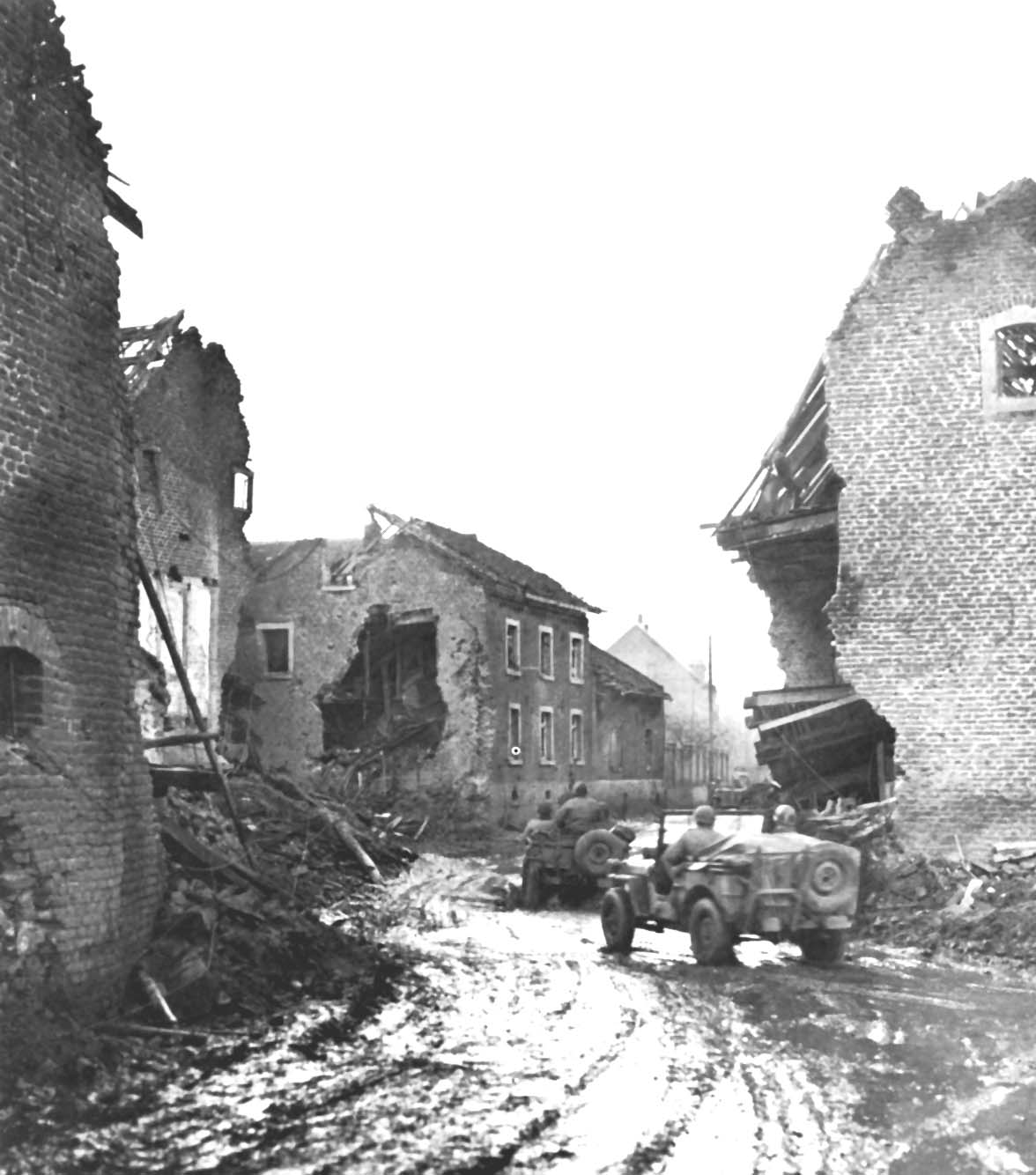
- Troops of the 4th Armored Division on their way to the front.
Date	1 September – 18 December 1944
Location	Lorraine, France
Result	Allied victory

Belligerents
United States; France	Germany

Commanders and leaders
George S. Patton	Johannes Blaskowitz; Hermann Balck

Casualties and losses
55,182: 6,657 killed in action; 36,406 wounded; 12,119 missing; 151 medium tanks destroyed (September 1944); 49 light tanks destroyed (September 1944) Dozens of M10 and M18 tank destroyers and other AFVs destroyed	75,000 captured 341 tanks destroyed

The Lorraine campaign was the operations of the U.S. Third Army in Lorraine during World War II from September 1 through December 18, 1944. Official U.S. Army campaign names for this period and location are Northern France and Rhineland. The term was popularized by the publication of the volume The Lorraine Campaign of the official history of the U.S. Army in 1950.

== Explanation of title ==
As written by the volume's author:

Precise military terminology has been employed, except in those cases where clarity and economy of style have dictated usage of a more general nature. Thus, the Third Army operations in Lorraine are considered to be a "campaign" in the general sense of the term, despite the fact that the Department of the Army does not award a separate campaign star for these operations.

Although the term Lorraine campaign is unofficial, it represents a more traditional use of the term "campaign" in that the battles described by the term were part of a larger operation that had a set goal. By contrast, the official U.S. Army campaign names refer to what were actually multiple campaigns and large military organizations with diverse goals.

Operationally, the Lorraine campaign encompasses the assaults across the Moselle and Sauer Rivers, the battles of Metz and Nancy, and the push to the German frontier and the crossing of the Saar/Sarre River during the first half of December 1944.

== Phases ==
=== Moselle ===
The Third Army, led by General Patton, lacking gasoline, was unable to swiftly take both Metz and Nancy, unlike the actions that characterized the rapid advance across France. After the Battle of Arracourt following the fall of Nancy and the meeting engagement of Mairy, the Third Army had to pause and await resupply. For the OKW, stopping Patton was a priority that resulted in replacements and reinforcements for the German Fifth Panzer Army and First Army.

=== Fortress Metz ===
Until 12 October 1944 and the beginning of the assault on Metz, exceptionally rainy weather hampered military operations. This combined with spirited German resistance and competent use of the terrain around Metz to delay the capture of Metz until late in November 1944.

=== Saar and Siegfried Line ===
After the fall of Metz and its fortifications, the Third Army launched an offensive to advance to the Westwall.

Offensive operations by the U.S. Army in this part of the Western Front resumed in mid-March 1945 with the objective of occupying the Saar-Palatinate.

The attack across the Saar River, beginning on 24 November, was under way as the Germans opened the Ardennes Offensive and Alsace-Lorraine Offensive. Operations on the Saar were scaled down as Third Army shifted troops north to counterattack the German offensive into Belgium and Luxembourg from the south. The move north of the Third Army marked the close of the Lorraine Campaign.

== Casualties ==
The 3rd Army sustained 55,182 combat casualties during the Lorraine Campaign (6,657 killed, 36,406 wounded, 12,119 missing).

Exact German losses in Lorraine are unknown, but were suspected to be severe. At least 75,000 German prisoners were captured by the 3rd Army during the offensive.

== Criticism ==
Historian Carlo D'Este wrote that the Lorraine campaign was one of Patton's least successful, faulting him for not deploying his divisions more aggressively and decisively. A 1985 US Army study of the Lorraine campaign was highly critical of Patton. The document states:

Few of the Germans defending Lorraine could be considered first-rate troops. Third Army encountered whole battalions made up of deaf men, others of cooks, and others consisting entirely of soldiers with stomach ulcers.

Soldiers and generals alike assumed that Lorraine would fall quickly, and unless the war ended first, Patton's tanks would take the war into Germany by summer's end. But Lorraine was not to be overrun in a lightning campaign. Instead, the battle for Lorraine would drag on for more than 3 months.

Moreover, once Third Army penetrated the province and entered Germany, there would still be no first-rate military objectives within its grasp. The Saar industrial region, while significant, was of secondary importance when compared to the great Ruhr industrial complex farther north.

Was the Lorraine campaign an American victory? From September through November, Third Army claimed to have inflicted over 180,000 casualties on the enemy. But to capture the province of Lorraine, a problem which involved an advance of only 40 to 60 air miles, Third Army required over 3 months and suffered 50,000 casualties, approximately one-third of the total number of casualties it sustained in the entire European war.

Ironically, Third Army never used Lorraine as a springboard for an advance into Germany after all. Patton turned most of the sector over to Seventh Army during the Ardennes crisis, and when the eastward advance resumed after the Battle of the Bulge, Third Army based its operations on Luxembourg, not Lorraine. The Lorraine campaign will always remain a controversial episode in American military history.

Finally, the Lorraine campaign demonstrated that logistics often drive operations, no matter how forceful and aggressive the commanding general may be.

He discovered that violating logistical principles is an unforgiving and cumulative matter.

The US Army study highlighted Patton's tendency to overstretch his supply lines.

== See also ==
- Battle of Fort Driant
- Battle of Dompaire
- Lorraine campaign order of battle
- Allied advance from Paris to the Rhine

== Sources ==
- Cole, Hugh M. (1950). The Lorraine Campaign (PDF). The United States Army in World War II: The European Theater of Operations. Washington, DC: Center of Military History. OCLC 1253758. Archived from the original (PDF) on September 27, 2012.
- D'Este, Carlo (1995). Patton: A Genius for War. New York City: HarperCollins. ISBN 978-0-06-016455-3.
