= JM cloche =

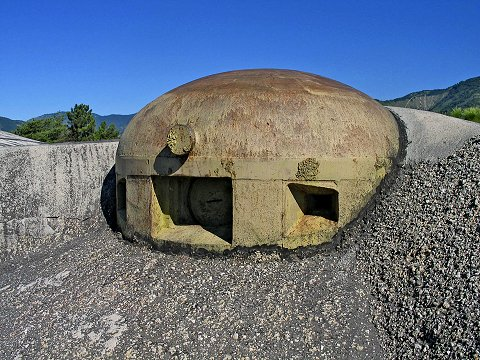
The outside of a JM cloche

The JM cloche was an element of the Maginot Line. It was a non-retractable non-rotating cupola of steel alloy like GFM cloches, but were armed with twin heavy machine guns, as opposed to the lighter automatic rifles associated with the GFM. There were 179 JM cloches on the Maginot Line.

JM is an acronym for Jumelage de Mitrailleuses (twin machine guns). While the MAC 31 heavy machine guns were of the same caliber (7.5mm) as those in GFM cloches, they had a longer practical range 1,200 metres (3,900 ft) and a maximum range of 4,900 metres (16,100 ft), with a 500 round per minute rate of fire.

== Description ==
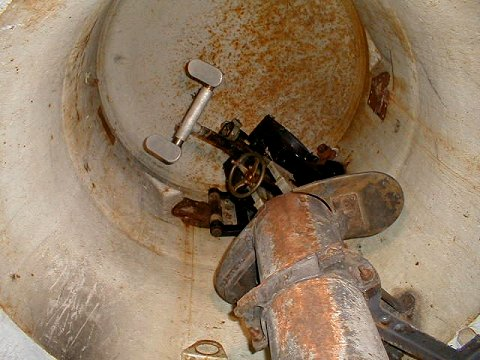
The inside of a JM cloche equipped with the twin machine guns

The JM cloche closely resembles the GFM cloche in size and construction. It exists in three versions, all designed Model 1930: small, large and two-man. JM cloches had a single firing port, which was flanked on either side by trapezoidal observation ports. The blank rear was frequently backed by a concrete-covered embankment, which provided additional cover and reduced the prominence of the cloche.

== AM cloche ==
The AM (Armes Mixte) cloche, Model 1934, could mount a 25mm anti-tank gun and paired machine guns in two separate ports. It lacked the JM's observation ports. Shutters could be put in place to close unused ports. The AM existed in both a large and a small version. 72 AM cloches were installed solely in the New Fronts fortifications.

=== AM conversions ===
Ten JM cloches were modified to accept a shortened 25mm anti-tank gun in place of the twin machine guns. The modifications took place in 1940 in several ouvrages of the northeast.

== See also ==
- LG cloche, grenade launcher cloche
- VDP cloche, observation cloche

== Bibliography ==
- Mary, Jean-Yves; Hohnadel, Alain; Sicard, Jacques. Hommes et Ouvrages de la Ligne Maginot, Tome 2. Paris, Histoire & Collections, 2001. ISBN 2-908182-97-1 (in French)
