= Lorraine campaign order of battle =

The following units and commanders participated in the Lorraine campaign from September 1 to December 18, 1944.

== U.S. Third Army ==
Lieutenant General George S. Patton Jr.

- Chief of Staff: Major General Hugh Gaffey

Corps	Division	Regiments and others
XII Corps; Major General Manton S. Eddy	Corps troops	2nd Cavalry Group; 106th Cavalry Group; 702nd Tank Battalion; 737th Tank Battalion; 761st Tank Battalion; 602nd Tank Destroyer Battalion (self-propelled); 603rd Tank Destroyer Battalion (self-propelled); 654th Tank Destroyer Battalion (self-propelled); 704th Tank Destroyer Battalion (self-propelled); 610th Tank Destroyer Battalion (towed); 691st Tank Destroyer Battalion (towed); 808th Tank Destroyer Battalion (towed); 177th Field Artillery Group; 182nd Field Artillery Group; 183rd Field Artillery Group; 404th Field Artillery Group; 410th Field Artillery Group
XII Corps; Major General Manton S. Eddy	26th Infantry Division Major General Willard S. Paul	101st Infantry Regiment; 104th Infantry Regiment; 328th Infantry Regiment; 101st, 102nd, 180th, and 263rd Field Artillery Battalions; 39th Signal Company; 726th Ordnance Light Maintenance Company; 26th Quartermaster Company; 26th Cavalry Reconnaissance Troop (Mechanized); 101st Engineer Combat Battalion; 114th Medical Battalion; 26th CIC Detachment
XII Corps; Major General Manton S. Eddy	35th Infantry Division Major General Paul W. Baade	134th Infantry Regiment; 137th Infantry Regiment; 320th Infantry Regiment; 127th, 161st, 216th, and 219th Field Artillery Battalions; 35th Signal Company; 735th Ordnance Light Maintenance Company; 35th Quartermaster Company; 35th Cavalry Reconnaissance Troop (Mechanized); 60th Engineer Combat Battalion; 110th Medical Battalion; 35th CIC Detachment
XII Corps; Major General Manton S. Eddy	80th Infantry Division Major General Horace L. McBride	317th Infantry Regiment; 318th Infantry Regiment; 319th Infantry Regiment; 313th, 314th, 315th, and 905th Field Artillery Battalions; 80th Signal Company; 780th Ordnance Light Maintenance Company; 80th Quartermaster Company; 80th Cavalry Reconnaissance Troop (Mechanized); 305th Engineer Combat Battalion; 305th Medical Battalion; 80th CIC Detachment
XII Corps; Major General Manton S. Eddy	4th Armored Division Major General John S. Wood	8th Tank Battalion; 35th Tank Battalion; 37th Tank Battalion; 10th Armored Infantry Battalion; 51st Armored Infantry Battalion; 53rd Armored Infantry Battalion; 22nd, 66th, and 94th Armored Field Artillery Battalions; 25th Cavalry Reconnaissance Squadron (Mechanized); 144th Armored Signal Company; 126th Ordnance Maintenance Battalion; 24th Armored Engineer Battalion; 4th Armored Medical Battalion; 504th CIC Detachment
XII Corps; Major General Manton S. Eddy	6th Armored Division Major General Robert W. Grow	15th Tank Battalion; 68th Tank Battalion; 69th Tank Battalion; 9th Armored Infantry Battalion; 44th Armored Infantry Battalion; 50th Armored Infantry Battalion; 128th, 212th, and 231st Armored Field Artillery Battalions; 86th Cavalry Reconnaissance Squadron (Mechanized); 146th Armored Signal Company; 128th Ordnance Maintenance Battalion; 25th Armored Engineer Battalion; 76th Armored Medical Battalion; 506th CIC Detachment
XX Corps; Major General Walton Walker	Corps troops	3rd Cavalry Group; 712th Tank Battalion; 735th Tank Battalion; 738th Tank Battalion; 609th Tank Destroyer Battalion (self-propelled); 705th Tank Destroyer Battalion (self-propelled); 773rd Tank Destroyer Battalion (self-propelled); 818th Tank Destroyer Battalion (self-propelled); 614th Tank Destroyer Battalion (towed); 774th Tank Destroyer Battalion (towed); 802nd Tank Destroyer Battalion (towed); 807th Tank Destroyer Battalion (towed); 5th Field Artillery Group (self-propelled); 40th Field Artillery Group; 193rd Field Artillery Group; 195th Field Artillery Group; 203rd Field Artillery Group; 204th Field Artillery Group
XX Corps; Major General Walton Walker	5th Infantry Division Major General Stafford LeRoy Irwin	2nd Infantry Regiment; 10th Infantry Regiment; 11th Infantry Regiment; 19th, 21st, 46th, and 50th Field Artillery Battalions; 5th Signal Company; 705th Ordnance Light Maintenance Company; 5th Quartermaster Company; 5th Cavalry Reconnaissance Troop (Mechanized); 7th Engineer Combat Battalion; 5th Medical Battalion; 5th CIC Detachment
XX Corps; Major General Walton Walker	90th Infantry Division Major General James Van Fleet	357th Infantry Regiment; 358th Infantry Regiment; 359th Infantry Regiment; 343rd, 344th, 345th, and 915th Field Artillery Battalions; 90th Signal Company; 790th Ordnance Light Maintenance Company; 90th Quartermaster Company; 90th Cavalry Reconnaissance Troop (Mechanized); 325th Engineer Combat Battalion; 315th Medical Battalion; 90th CIC Detachment
XX Corps; Major General Walton Walker	95th Infantry Division Major General Harry L. Twaddle	377th Infantry Regiment; 378th Infantry Regiment; 379th Infantry Regiment; 358th, 359th, 360th, and 920th Field Artillery Battalions; 95th Signal Company; 795th Ordnance Light Maintenance Company; 95th Quartermaster Company; 95th Cavalry Reconnaissance Troop (Mechanized); 320th Engineer Battalion; 320th Medical Battalion; 95th CIC Detachment
XX Corps; Major General Walton Walker	10th Armored Division Major General William H. H. Morris Jr.	3rd Tank Battalion; 11th Tank Battalion; 21st Tank Battalion; 20th Armored Infantry Battalion; 54th Armored Infantry Battalion; 61st Armored Infantry Battalion; 419th, 420th, and 423rd Armored Field Artillery Battalions; 150th Armored Signal Company; 132nd Ordnance Maintenance Battalion; 90th Cavalry Reconnaissance Squadron (Mechanized); 55th Armored Engineer Battalion; 80th Armored Medical Battalion; 510th CIC Detachment

== German Army Group G ==
Army Group G was commanded by General der Panzertruppe Hermann Balck.

Balck, who had since August been in charge of the Fourth Panzer Army on the Eastern Front took command on 21 September replacing Johannes Blaskowitz who had lost a substantial amount of his forces in the retreat following the Allied invasion of the south of France.

His chief of staff was Friedrick von Mellenthin

The 1st Army (1. Armee) was commanded by General der Panzertruppe Otto von Knobelsdorff

=== XIII SS Army Corps ===
XIII SS Army Corps was commanded by Generalleutnant der Waffen-SS Hermann Prieß

Division	Regiments and others
Corps troops	1431st Fortress Battalion; 43rd Machinegun Battalion; 111th Flak Battalion; 401st Volks Artillery Corps
347th Infantry Division Lieutenant General Wolf-Günther Trierenberg	860th Grenadier Regiment; 861st Grenadier Regiment; 862nd Grenadier Regiment; 347th Artillery Regiment; 347th Fusilier Battalion; 347th Tank Destroyer Battalion; 347th Engineer Battalion; 347th Signal Battalion; 347th Field Replacement Battalion; 347th Divisional Supply Troops
36th Volksgrenadier Division Major General August Wellm	87th Grenadier Regiment; 118th Grenadier Regiment; 165th Grenadier Regiment; 268th Artillery Regiment; 36th Fusilier Company; 36th FLaK Company; 1036th Assault-gun detachment; 36th Tank Destroyer Battalion; 36th Signal Company; 36th Pioneer Company; 36th Supply Regiment; 36th Divisional Supply Troops
48th Volksgrenadier Division	126th Grenadier Regiment; 127th Grenadier Regiment; 128th Grenadier Regiment; 148th Artillery Regiment; 48th Fusilier Battalion; 148th Tank Destroyer Battalion; 148th Engineer Battalion; 148th Signal Battalion; 148th Divisional Supply Troops
559th Volksgrenadier Division MG Kurt von Muehlen	1125th Grenadier Regiment; 1126th Grenadier Regiment; 1127th Grenadier Regiment; 1559th Artillery Regiment; 1559th Fusilier Company; 1559th Tank Destroyer Battalion; 1559th Pioneer Battalion
Panzer Lehr Division (130th Panzer Division) Lieutenant General Fritz Bayerlein	130th Panzer Lehr Regiment; 901st Panzergrenadier Lehr Regiment; 902nd Panzergrenadier Lehr Regiment; 130th Panzer Lehr Artillery Regiment; 130th Panzer Lehr Reconnaissance Battalion; 130th Tank Destroyer Battalion; 130th Panzer Lehr Engineer Battalion; 130th Panzer Lehr Signal Battalion; 311th Army Panzer Anti-Aircraft Battalion
11th Panzer Division Lieutenant General Wend von Wietersheim	15th Panzer Regiment; 4th Panzergrenadier Regiment; 110th Panzergrenadier Regiment; 76th Artillery Regiment; 61st Tank Destroyer Battalion; 11th Reconnaissance Battalion; 277th Anti-Aircraft Battalion; 209th Pioneer Battalion; 89th Signal Battalion; 61st Field Replacement Battalion
17th SS Panzergrenadier Division (Note: The division had suffered heavy losses in Normandy. It had been withdrawn and rebuilt with what was left of SS Panzergrenadier Brigade 49 and SS Panzergrenadier Brigade 51) Hans Lingner	37th SS Panzergrenadier Regiment; 38th SS Panzergrenadier Regiment; 17th SS Panzer Battalion; 17th SS Artillery Regiment; 17th SS Tank Destroyer Battalion; 17th SS Assault Gun Battalion; 17th SS Flak Battalion; 17th SS Signal Battalion; 17th SS Panzer Reconnaissance Battalion; 17th SS Pionier Battalion; 17th SS Division Supply Troops; 17th SS Panzer Repair Battalion; 17th SS Wirtschafts Battalion; 17th SS Medical Battalion
25th Panzergrenadier Division (Note: Formed in November by upgrading 107th Panzer Brigade) Generalleutnant Paul Schürmann	35th Panzergrenadier Regiment; 119th Panzergrenadier Regiment; 8th Panzer Battalion; 25th Panzer Reconnaissance Battalion; 125th Tank Destroyer Battalion; 25th Artillery Regiment; 25th Signals Battalion

=== LXXXIX Corps ===
LXXXIX Corps, General der infanterie Gustav Höhne (took command 7 September 1944)

- 361st Volksgrenadier Division (Generalmajor Alfred Philippi, appointed 1 September 1944 )
  - 951st Grenadier Regiment
  - 952nd Grenadier Regiment
  - 953rd Grenadier Regiment
  - 361st Artillery Regiment
  - 361st Fusilier Battalion
  - 361st Tank Destroyer Company
  - 361st Engineer Battalion
  - 361st Signal Battalion
  - 361st Field Replacement Battalion
  - 361st Divisional Supply Troops
- 553rd Infantry Division
  - 1119th Regiment
  - 1120th Regiment

=== LXXXII Corps ===
LXXXII Corps, General der Infanterie Walter Hörnlein

Division	Regiments and others
Corps troops	1010th Security Regiment; 22nd Fortress Regiment; 25th Fortress Regiment; 43rd Fortress Battalion; 44th Machinegun Battalion; 45th Machinegun Battalion; 48th Machinegun Battalion; 53rd Machinegun Battalion; 55th Engineer Battalion; 811th Flak Battalion; 243rd Assault Gun Brigade; 404th Volks Artillery Corps; 485th Antitank Battalion
19th Volksgrenadier Division Generalleutnant Walter Wissmath	59th Grenadier Regiment; 73rd Grenadier Regiment; 74th Grenadier Regiment; 119th Artillery Regiment; 119th Fusilier Battalion; 119th Engineer Battalion; 119th Tank Destroyer Battalion; 119th Signal Battalion; 119th Field Replacement Battalion; 119th Divisional Supply Troops
416th Infantry Division	712th Grenadier Regiment; 713th Grenadier Regiment; 774th Grenadier Regiment; 416th Artillery Regiment; 416th Fusilier Company; 416th Tank Destroyer Battalion; 416th Pionier Battalion; 416th Signal Battalion; 416th Sanitary Battalion; 416th Field Replacement Battalion
462nd Infantry Division	1215th Regiment; 1216th Regiment; 1217th Regiment
21st Panzer Division Generalleutnant Edgar Feuchtinger	22nd Panzer Regiment; 125th Panzer Grenadier Regiment; 192nd Panzer Grenadier Regiment; 155th Panzer Artillery Regiment; 21st Panzer Reconnaissance Battalion; 200th Assault Gun Battalion; 200th Anti-tank Battalion; 200th Panzer Signals Battalion; 220th Panzer Engineer Battalion; 305th Flak Battalion

== Sources ==
- Balkoski, Joseph. " Patton's 3rd Army: The Lorraine Campaign, 8 Nov. – 1 Dec. '44" in Strategy & Tactics, no. 78 (January/February 1980).
- Mitcham, Jr., Samuel W. German Order of Battle, volume 1: 1st–290th Infantry Divisions in WW II. Mechanicsburg, Pennsylvania: Stackpole Books, 2007. ISBN 978-0-8117-3416-5.
- Mitcham, Jr., Samuel W. German Order of Battle, volume 2: 291st–999th Infantry Divisions, Named Infantry Divisions, and Special Divisions in WWII. Mechanicsburg, Pennsylvania: Stackpole Books, 2007. ISBN 978-0-8117-3437-0.
