= 167th Volksgrenadier Division =

167th Infantry Division 167th Volksgrenadier Division
- Active: November 1939 – April 1945
- Country: Nazi Germany
- Branch: Heer
- Type: Infantry; Volksgrenadier (1945)
- Size: Division
- Engagements: Second World War

The 167th Volksgrenadier Division (German: 167. Volksgrenadierdivision), formerly the 167th Infantry Division (German: 167. Infanteriedivision) was a German Army infantry division in World War II.

== Operational history ==
=== Formation and France ===
The 167th Infantry Division was formed in the Bavarian capital of Munich in November 1939, absorbing the 7th; 27th and 34th Field-Replacement Battalions from their respective divisions in January. It was also at this point that its commanding officer, Colonel Gilbert, was promoted to major general, shortly before his replacement by Lieutenant General Oskar Vogl.

The division took part in the initial 1940 invasion of France with Army Group C, capturing Ouvrage Kerfent and Ouvrage Bambesch - two components of the Maginot Line - between 20 and 21 June. The division remained in occupied France until February 1941, when it returned to its garrison in Bavaria. In August 1940, Major General Hans Schönhärl took over as commanding officer, being promoted to lieutenant general in December.

=== Barbarossa and the Soviet Union ===
In June 1941, the division was transferred to the occupied Polish capital of Warsaw as the Axis forces began their assault on the Soviet Union in Operation Barbarossa. In August, Schönhärl was replaced as commanding officer by Major General Verner Schartow, himself replaced by Major General Wolf Trierenberg. On December 17, Red Army forces succeeded in punching a hole in the 167th's sector, only to be forced back by support from the 112th Infantry, with some tank support.

Later the Division took part in the Battle of Moscow, Battle of Kursk, and finally against the Dnieper–Carpathian Offensive, where the 167th Infantry Division was disbanded due to heavy losses in January 1944.

=== Second formation as 167th Volksgrenadier Division (October 1944) ===
The re-created division, based on the 585th Volksgrenadier Division and now designated 167. Volksgrenadierdivision, took part in the Ardennes Offensive. On New Years Day, it, along with the 5th Parachute Division, aided the panzers in defending the area around the Belgian village of Lutrebois in Luxembourg. While the three were able to hold off the approaching Americans and dealt heavy casualties to their enemies, the situation elsewhere in the Ardennes was different and the 167th was ordered to fall back.

== Commanders ==
- Major General Martin Gilbert (1 December 1939 – 10 January 1940)
- Major General Oskar Vogl (10 January – 2 August 1940)
- Lieutenant General Hans Schönhärl (2 August 1940 – 11 August 1941)
- Major General Verner Schartow (11 August 1941)
- Lieutenant General Wolf-Günther Trierenberg (11 August 1941 – 25 November 1943)
- Colonel Hans Hüttner (25 November 1943 – 1 February 1944)
- Lieutenant General Hanskurt Höcker (17 October 1944 – 4 April 1945)

== Area of Operation ==
- Germany (December 1939 – May 1940)
- France (June 1940 – February 1941)
- Germany (March – May 1941)
- Eastern front, Central section (June 1941 – April 1942)
- Netherlands (May 1942 – February 1943)
- Eastern front, Southern section (March 1943 – February 1944)
- Ardennes and Eifel (December 1944 – April 1945)
