= Fortified Sector of Faulquemont =

The Fortified Sector of Faulquemont (Secteur Fortifiée de Faulquemont) was the French military organization that in 1940 controlled the section of the Maginot Line in the area of Faulquemont to the east of Metz. With five petit ouvrages the sector was poorly equipped with fortress artillery, limiting the ouvrages ability to provide mutual support. The sector was attacked in 1940 by German forces in the Battle of France. Despite the withdrawal of the mobile forces that supported the fixed fortifications, the sector mounted a strong resistance. Two of the petit ouvrages fell to German attack, the remainder holding out until the Second Armistice at Compiègne. The surviving positions and their garrisons finally surrendered on 2 June 1940. During the Cold War, Ouvrage Kerfent was partially reactivated as a communications station for Royal Canadian Air Force units stationed in northwestern France with NATO. At present, most of the underground works in the sector are flooded by groundwater. Only Ouvrage Bambesch has been preserved and may be toured by the public.

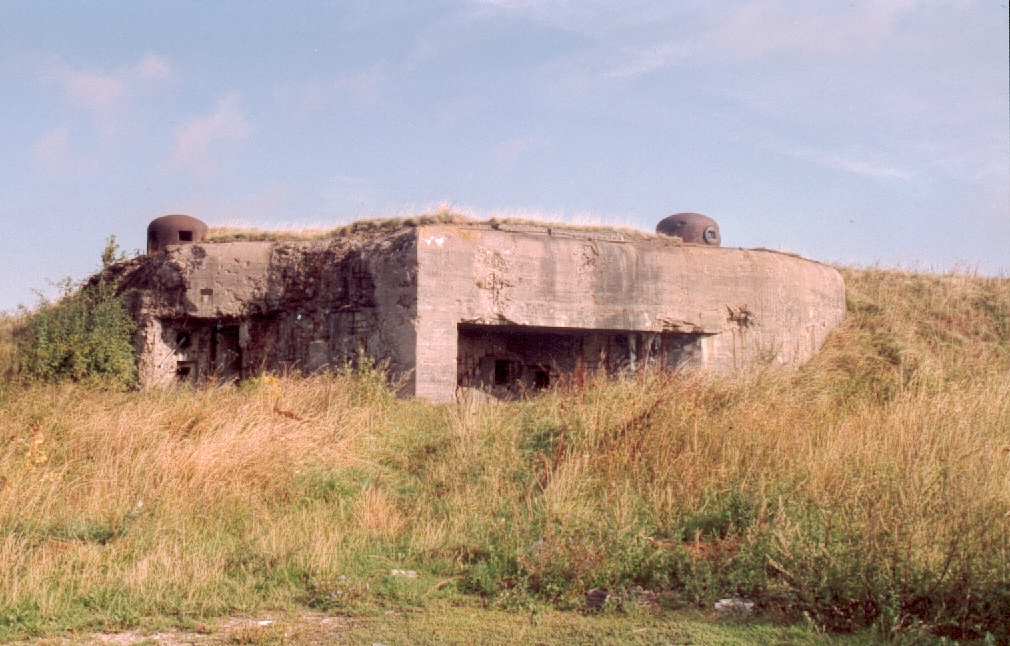
Casemate des Quatre Vents Sud

== Concept and organization ==
The Faulquemont sector was part of the larger Fortified Region of Metz, a strongly defended area between the Ardennes to the west and the Sarre valley to the east. The Metz region was more important during the planning and construction phase of the Maginot Line than it was in the operational phase of the Line, when the sectors assumed prominence. The Fortified Region of Metz was dissolved as a military organization on 18 March 1940.

The initial plans for the sector in 1930 envisioned the construction of four gros ouvrages, (Note: English-language sources use the French term ouvrage as the preferred term for the Maginot positions, in preference to "fort", a term usually reserved for older fortifications with passive defenses in the form of walls and ditches. The literal translation of ouvrage in the sense of a fortification in English is "work." A gros ouvrage is a large fortification with a significant artillery component, while a petit ouvrage is smaller, with lighter arms.) eight petit ouvrages and 23 casemates. Since the sector was of second importance, by the time work began in the sector the building programme had been cut back. All of the Faulquemont ouvrages were infantry works. There were no gros ouvrages mounting heavy artillery in the sector. Lacking such major works, the sector formed an extension of the weaker right wing of the neighboring SF Boulay, whose eastern positions were similarly lacking in artillery. Uniquely, artillery support in the SF Faulquemont was provided by three casemates behind the main line firing to either side along the line. The artillery casemates resemble detached artillery blocks from a gros ouvrage. However, these casemates were evacuated on 15 June 1940 and played no major role in the fighting around the ouvrages. A follow-up programme was planned to augment the ouvrages with artillery, but financial difficulties delayed the projected start date in 1940. The artillery casemates were completed in 1937–1938.

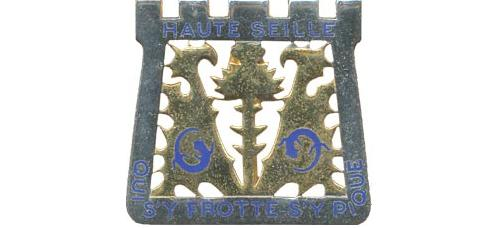
Insignia of the 69th RIF.

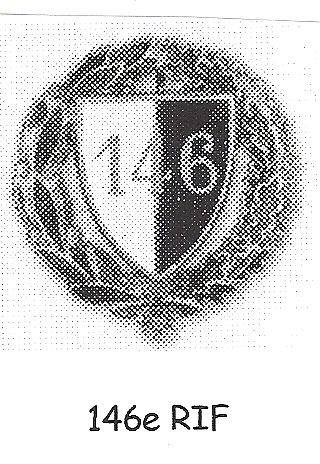
Insignia of the 146th RIF.

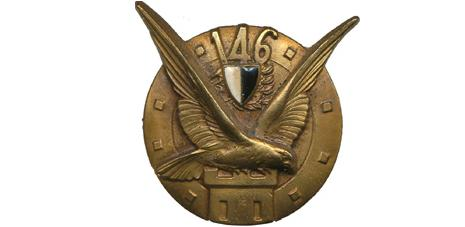
Insignia of the 146th RIF (1938).

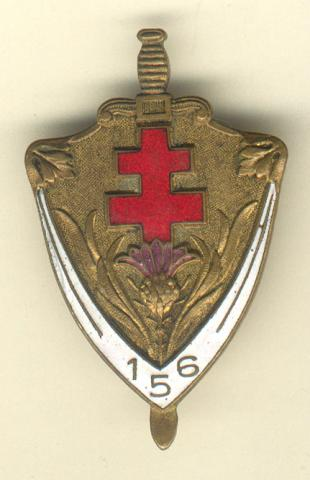
Insignia of the 156th RIF.

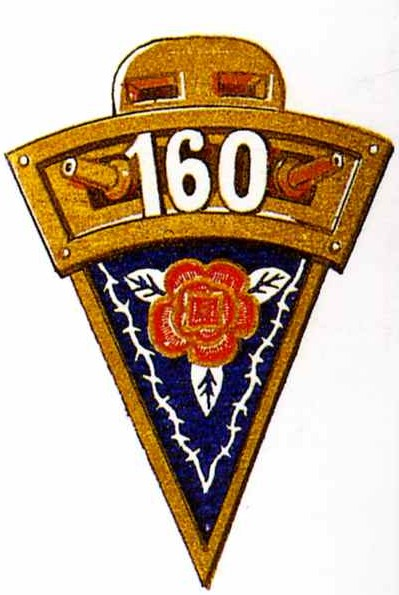
Insignia of the 160th RIF.

== Command ==
The Faulquemont sector was under the overall command of the French 3rd Army, headquartered at Fort Jeanne d'Arc at Metz, under the command of General Charles Condé, which was in turn part of Army Group 2 under General André-Gaston Prételat. The SF Faulquemont was commanded by General Baudoin until 14 April 1940, then General Mendras until 29 April, and finally General de Girval. The command post was at Helfdange. The interval troops, the army formations that were to provide the mobile defense for the sector, to support and be supported by the fixed defenses, were under the command of the 9th Corps (9e Corps d'Armee), General Laure, commander. The 6th Corps included the 47th Infantry Division. Artillery support for the sector was provided by the 163rd Position Artillery Regiment (Régiment d'Artillerie de Position (RAP)), which controlled both fixed and mobile artillery, commanded by Lieutenant Colonel Hanoteau. The 47th ID was a Class A reserve formation.

At the midpoint of the Battle of France on 1 June 1940, the fortress troops of the SF Faulquemont amounted to four fortress infantry regiments in twelve battalions, comprising 645 officers and 18,850 men. During the general retreat from the French frontier in mid-June the sector's mobile forces were designated the groupement Girval, comprising the 146th and 156th RIFs, the 69th and 82nd RMIFs (from the SF Sarre), the second and third battalions of the 39th RAMF, the first battalion of the 163rd RAP and the first and second battalions of the 166th RAP, and several other battalions. These units were attached to the 20th Army Corps.

== Description ==
The sector includes, in order from west to east, the following major fortified positions, together with the most significant casemates and infantry shelters in each sub-sector:

=== Sub-sector of Narbéfontaine ===
Transferred to the SF Boulay.

=== Sub-sector of Steinbesch ===
156th Fortress Infantry Regiment (156^{e} Régiment d'Infanterie de Forteresse (RIF)), Lt. Colonel Milon, command post at Éperon, northeast of Haute-Vigneulles

- Ouvrage Kerfent, petit ouvrage A34 of four combat blocks
- Ouvrage Bambesch, petit ouvrage A35 of three combat blocks
- Ouvrage Einseling, petit ouvrage A36, one combat block
- Ouvrage Laudrefang, petit ouvrage A37 of four combat blocks
- Artillery casemate de Bambesch, ACa3, with two 75mm guns
- Casemate de Bambiderstroff Nord, C70
- Casemate de Bambiderstroff Sud, C71
- Casemate d'Einseling Nord, C72
- Casemate d'Einseling Sud, C73
- Casemate des Quatre-Vents Nord, C74
- Casemate des Quatre-Vents Sud, C75
- Artillery casemate de Stocken, ACa2, with two 75mm guns

Peacetime barracks and support:

- Casernement de Zimming

=== Sub-sector of the Bois-des-Chênes ===
146th Fortress Infantry Regiment (146^{e} Régiment d'Infanterie de Forteresse (RIF)), Lt. Colonel Prat, command post at Steinbusch, later Pontpierre

- Ouvrage Pontpierre, petit ouvrage, never built
- Ouvrage Téting, petit ouvrage A38 of three combat blocks and an entry block
- Casemate du Bois-de-Laudrefang Nord, C76
- Casemate du Bois-de-Laudrefang Sud, C77
- Artillery casemate de Téting, ACa1

A number of blockhouses, demountable turrets and observation points were scattered in the interval spaces in the sub-sector between the river Nied and the Casernement de Téting..

Peacetime barracks and support:

- Casernement de Téting

== History ==
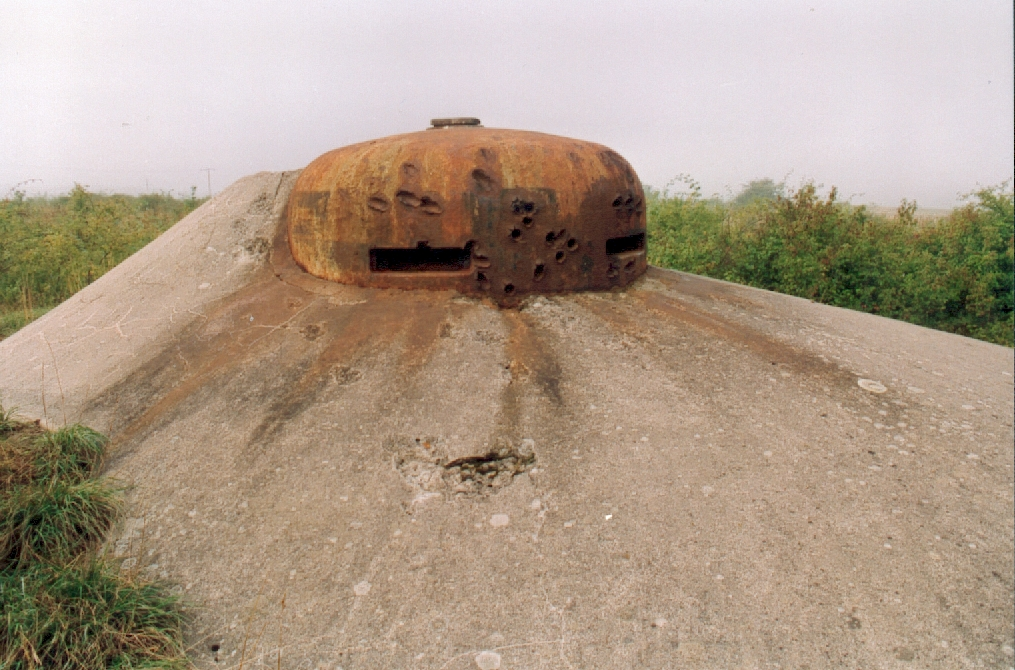
Block 5, Laudrefang

=== 1940 ===
In early June in the face of the German assault, and with the collapse of the left wing of the French armies in Flanders, all fortress units attached to the Third Army were ordered to prepare for withdrawal to the south and west between 14 and 17 June The interval personnel of the SF Faulquemont were to be consolidated into a unit entitled the Groupement Girval, consisting of the 146th and 156th RIFs, together with units from the SF Sarre. On 13 June the troops of the field army in the intervals between fortifications began to withdraw towards the south, followed the next day by the fortress units designated for withdrawal. The withdrawal left the ouvrage garrisons in their positions to cover the withdrawal of the interval troops and the fortress infantry assigned to the divisions de marche. The Groupement Girval was assigned to the Third Army.

Following the 15 June 1940 breakthrough by German forces through the Saar gap, the Germans advanced along the rear of the Maginot Line. The German 167th Infantry Division approached Kerfent, Bambesch, Einseling and Téting, now manned only by their individual garrisons, on 19 June. The 167th was a weak, inexperienced formation. However, the 167th's parent unit, Höheres Kommando XXXXV, had obtained extra 8.8cm high-velocity guns, which had proven particularly effective against Maginot positions in other sectors. On the 20th the Germans assaulted Bambesch. After an initial infantry assault was repelled, a sustained barrage with 8.8 cm guns on Block 2 drove the defenders into the underground galleries. With further attacks on Block 3, the defenders risked entrapment and asphyxiation. Supporting fire from Kerfent was of limited use, since the petit ouvrage did not mount heavy weapons. Bambesch surrendered at 1900 hours. German casualties were six wounded and one dead.

The following day the Wehrmacht attacked Kerfent with 8.8 cm fire from a battery positioned atop Bambesch. Kerfent's cloches were hit by direct fire and Block 3 had to be abandoned after it was holed. The German batteries approached to within 100 metres (330 ft) to attack Block 2 using the cover of the nearby woods. A follow-up infantry assault ran into trouble, taking fire from Mottemberg and the Mottemberg Sud casemate in addition to Kerfent's machine gun turret. Despite this support, Kerfent was forced to surrender. The Germans suffered four dead and thirty wounded.

On the 21st the Germans] attacked Einseling, which was more fortunate, as it was within range of Laudrefang's 81mm mortars, the only such weapons in the sector. Einseling benefitted as well from a French ruse. French soldiers occupied nearby interval casemates at night, convincing the Germans that the casemates, which were evacuated by day, still harbored combat teams. The Germans divided their fire between the casemates and the ouvrage. Laudrefang's fire, along with accurate fire from Einseling's lighter weapons, broke up a German artillery attack. The defense was supported by the Quatre-Vents Nord casemate, which had been re-occupied by French teams. The ouvrage survived until the Second Armistice at Compiègne took effect on 25 June, when it surrendered. Téting fared similarly. After a disorderly German retreat the infantry attacks were suspended in favor of an artillery barrage at Laudrefang, firing between 3000 and 3500 rounds at the ouvrage. Compared to other German attacks on other ouvrages, the bombardment of Laudrefang was relatively ineffectual. While the concrete structure was badly damaged, it was not perforated, and the mortar turrets and cloches were not hit. The ouvrage survived until the Second Armistice at Compiègne took effect on 25 June, when it surrendered. The machine gun turret at Block 3 was used for testing of shaped-charge munitions.

==== Units ====
The 146th Fortress Infantry Regiment (the Faulquemont Regiment) held the Bois-des Chênes sub-sector. The regiment's third battalion sw action in September 1939, when it participated in an incursion in the Warndt Forest, with fighting on 9 September at Ludwiller. The regiment's interval troops were ordered to retreat on 14 May 1940, initially to the north, but on the 16th their orders were changed to have them regroup to the south on the Marne-Rhine Canal, where it was hoped that a defense could be established. However, some of the regiment's 21st battalion were captured near Domptail by elements of the German 198th Infantry Division and shot out of hand. The remainder of the 146th's mobile regiments surrendered near Saint-Dié on 23 June. The troops who remained in their positions surrendered on 2 July.

The 156th Fortress Infantry Regiment was in charge of the Zimming sub-sector. In September 1939 the unit's third battalion participated in the Warndt incursion, from 8 September to 20 September. The regiment's interval troops were ordered to retreat on 13 June 1940, and the interval casemates followed suit on the 15th. The ouvrages remained manned. The regiment's mobile units were attached to the groupement Girval, which retreated to the south. The regiment surrendered on 22 June. The combat teams left behind at the ouvrages fought on, with Bambesch and Kerfent surrendering under fire on 21 June. The remaining ouvrages surrendered after the armistice on 2 July.

=== 1944 ===
The sector did not see significant action during the Lorraine Campaign of 1944, but Kerfent's observation block's cloche was used for weapons tests by the Americans.

=== Cold War ===
After the war, Kerfent's combat blocks were mostly left in their damaged state, but the underground facilities were cleaned and maintained. From 1958 to 1961, prior to France's withdrawal from the NATO integrated command structure in the mid-1960s, Kerfent's underground portions and open surface areas were used by the Canadian 601st Communications Squadron as a communications center, supporting RCAF Station Grostenquin. A microwave antenna was erected on Block 2. By 1970, Kerfent was listed for disposal, and was acquired by the commune of Zimming. The military antenna was replaced by a civil television antenna. Bambesch was stabilized after the war by military engineers and was acquired by the community of Bambiderstroff. The site was opened to the public on 31 August 1973. Einseling, Téting and Laudrefang were in poor condition and were not chosen for renovation.

== Present status ==
Groundwater intrusion is a problem in the SF Faulquemont. Bambesch is preserved and is open for public tours on occasion. Kerfent, though flooded, is interpreted by local volunteers who tour the surface of the ouvrage. Likewise, the surface of Einseling may be visited, but the underground works are flooded. Laudrefang is abandoned and flooded. Téting is abandoned and vandalized, but retains some of its equipment.

== Bibliography ==
- Allcorn, William. The Maginot Line 1928-45. Oxford: Osprey Publishing, 2003. ISBN 1-84176-646-1
- Degon, André; Zylberyng, Didier, La Ligne Maginot: Guide des Forts à Visiter, Editions Ouest-France, 2014. ISBN 978-2-7373-6080-0 (in French)
- Kaufmann, J.E. and Kaufmann, H.W. Fortress France: The Maginot Line and French Defenses in World War II, Stackpole Books, 2006. ISBN 0-275-98345-5
- Kaufmann, J.E., Kaufmann, H.W., Jancovič-Potočnik, A. and Lang, P. The Maginot Line: History and Guide, Pen and Sword, 2011. ISBN 978-1-84884-068-3
- Mary, Jean-Yves; Hohnadel, Alain; Sicard, Jacques. Hommes et Ouvrages de la Ligne Maginot, Tome 1. Paris, Histoire & Collections, 2001. ISBN 2-908182-88-2 (in French)
- Mary, Jean-Yves; Hohnadel, Alain; Sicard, Jacques. Hommes et Ouvrages de la Ligne Maginot, Tome 3. Paris, Histoire & Collections, 2003. ISBN 2-913903-88-6 (in French)
- Mary, Jean-Yves; Hohnadel, Alain; Sicard, Jacques. Hommes et Ouvrages de la Ligne Maginot, Tome 5. Paris, Histoire & Collections, 2009. ISBN 978-2-35250-127-5 (in French)
- Romanych, Marc; Rupp, Martin. Maginot Line 1940: Battles on the French Frontier. Oxford: Osprey Publishing, 2010. ISBN 1-84176-646-1
