= 347th Division =

347th Division may refer to:

- 347th Infantry Division, Wehrmacht, Germany
- 347th Rifle Division, Soviet Union

== See also ==
- List of military divisions by number
