= Ouvrage Coume Annexe Nord =

- Part of Maginot Line
- Northeast France

Site information
- Controlled by: France

Location
- Location within France
- Coordinates: 49.18917°N 6.57944°E

Site history
- In use: Abandoned
- Materials: Concrete, steel
- Battles/wars: Battle of France

Ouvrage Coume Annexe Nord is a lesser work (petit ouvrage) of the Maginot Line. Located in the Fortified Sector of Boulay, the ouvrage consists of one infantry block, and is located between petits ouvrages Village Coume and Coume, facing Germany.

== Design and construction ==
The site was surveyed by CORF (Commission d'Organisation des Régions Fortifiées), the Maginot Line's design and construction agency; Village Coume was approved for construction in July 1931. It was completed at a cost of 7 million francs by the contractor Duval-Weyrich of Nancy. The petit ouvrage (Note: English-language sources use the French term ouvrage as the preferred term for the Maginot positions, in preference to "fort", a term usually reserved for older fortifications with passive defensives in the form of walls and ditches. The literal translation of ouvrage in the sense of a fortification in English is "work." A gros ouvrage is a large fortification with a significant artillery component, while a petit ouvrage is smaller, with lighter arms.) was in effect designed, and built as an isolated casemate, as opposed to an ouvrage with multiple combat blocks, deep underground support services and accommodations

== Description ==
Coume Annex Nord comprises a single casemate. Armament includes two automatic rifle cloches (GFM), one retractable twin machine gun turret, one twin machine gun embrasure and one machine gun/anti-tank gun embrasure (JM/AC47).

== Manning ==
The 1940 manning of the ouvrage under the command of Lieutenant Dillenschneider comprised 35 men and 1 officer of the 161st Fortress Infantry Regiment. The units were under the umbrella of the 3rd Army, Army Group 2. The Casernement de Ban Saint-Jean provided peacetime above-ground barracks and support services to Village Coume and other positions in the area.

== History ==
See Fortified Sector of Boulay for a broader discussion of the Boulay sector of the Maginot Line.

Coume Annexe Nord played no significant role in either the Battle of France in 1940 or the Lorraine Campaign of 1944.

== Current condition ==
Coume Annexe Nord remains in good condition, in private ownership.

== See also ==
- List of all works on Maginot Line
- Siegfried Line
- Atlantic Wall
- Czechoslovak border fortifications

== Bibliography ==
- Allcorn, William. The Maginot Line 1928-45. Oxford: Osprey Publishing, 2003. ISBN 1-84176-646-1
- Kaufmann, J.E. and Kaufmann, H.W. Fortress France: The Maginot Line and French Defenses in World War II, Stackpole Books, 2006. ISBN 0-275-98345-5
- Kaufmann, J.E., Kaufmann, H.W., Jancovič-Potočnik, A. and Lang, P. The Maginot Line: History and Guide, Pen and Sword, 2011. ISBN 978-1-84884-068-3
- Mary, Jean-Yves; Hohnadel, Alain; Sicard, Jacques. Hommes et Ouvrages de la Ligne Maginot, Tome 1. Paris, Histoire & Collections, 2001. ISBN 2-908182-88-2 (in French)
- Mary, Jean-Yves; Hohnadel, Alain; Sicard, Jacques. Hommes et Ouvrages de la Ligne Maginot, Tome 2. Paris, Histoire & Collections, 2003. ISBN 2-908182-97-1 (in French)
- Mary, Jean-Yves; Hohnadel, Alain; Sicard, Jacques. Hommes et Ouvrages de la Ligne Maginot, Tome 3. Paris, Histoire & Collections, 2003. ISBN 2-913903-88-6 (in French)
- Mary, Jean-Yves; Hohnadel, Alain; Sicard, Jacques. Hommes et Ouvrages de la Ligne Maginot, Tome 5. Paris, Histoire & Collections, 2009. ISBN 978-2-35250-127-5 (in French)
