= Ouvrage Téting =

Lesser work of the Maginot Line

- Part of Maginot Line
- Northeast France
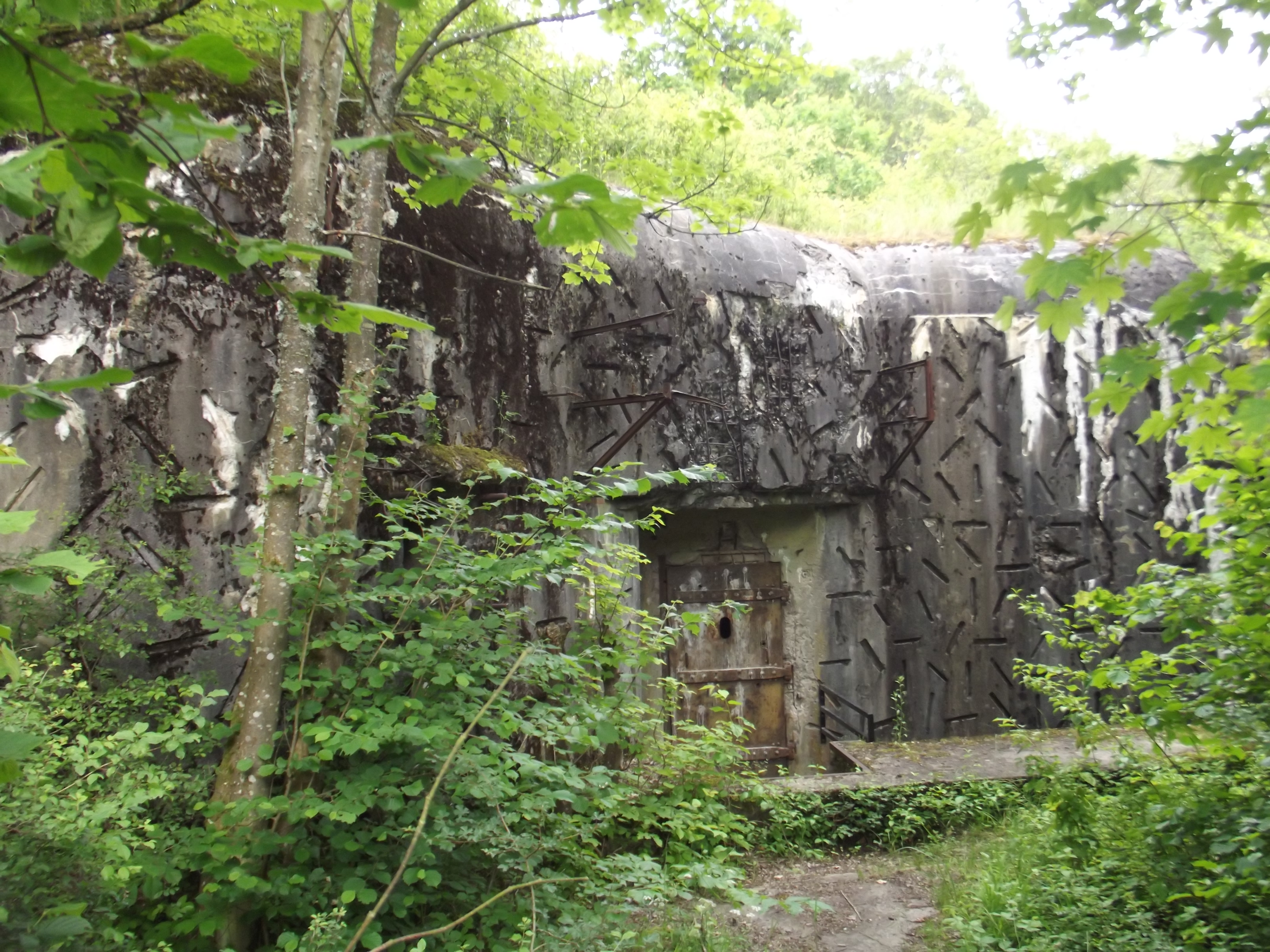
- Téting Block 3

Site information
- Controlled by: France

Location
- Coordinates: 49.07025°N 6.65611°E

Site history
- In use: Abandoned
- Materials: Concrete, steel, deep excavation
- Battles/wars: Battle of France

Ouvrage Téting is a lesser work (petit ouvrage) of the Maginot Line. Located in the Fortified Sector of Faulquemont, the ouvrage consists of one infantry block and two observation blocks, and is located facing Germany between petits ouvrages Laudrefang and the Saar valley, which was to be inundated in times of emergency. With artillery support from its neighbor Laudrefang, Téting held out against German bombardment during the Battle of France in 1940. It is now abandoned.

== Design and construction ==
The site was surveyed by the Commission d'Organisation des Régions Fortifiées (CORF), the Maginot Line's design and construction agency, and was approved for construction in January 1931. Téting was completed at a cost of 11 million francs by the contractor Générale des Travaux Publics. The petit ouvrage (Note: English-language sources use the French term ouvrage as the preferred term for the Maginot positions, in preference to "fort", a term usually reserved for older fortifications with passive defenses in the form of walls and ditches. The literal translation of ouvrage in the sense of a fortification in English is "work." A gros ouvrage is a large fortification with a significant artillery component, while a petit ouvrage is smaller, with lighter arms.) was to be expanded in a second phase with an 81mm mortar turret and a separate entrance block.

== Description ==
Téting comprises three infantry blocks. Blocks 1 and 2 are linked by deep underground galleries, which also provide modest space for barracks, utilities and ammunition storage. The galleries are excavated at an average depth of up to 30 metres (98 ft). Block 3 is not connected. A plan to provide gallery access to the block in Phase 2 was not undertaken.

- Block 1: Infantry block with one automatic rifle cloche (GFM) and two twin machine gun cloches (JM).
- Block 2: Infantry block with one GFM cloche, one grenade launcher cloche (LG) and one retractable twin machine gun turret, one twin machine gun embrasure and one machine gun/anti-tank gun embrasure (JM/AC47).
- Block 3: Infantry/entry block with two GFM cloches, one twin machine gun embrasure and one machine gun/anti-tank gun embrasure (JM/AC47). The block was heavily damaged by German bombardment in 1940.

=== Casemates and shelters ===
In addition to the connected combat blocks and Block 3, two small blockhouses mounting light arms are mixed among the combat blocks. A series of detached casemates and infantry shelters surround Téting, including

- Casemate du Bois-de-Laudrefang Nord: SIngle block with one mortar cloche, one GFM-A cloche and one GFM-A/B cloche.
- Casemate du Bois-de-Laudrefang Sud: SIngle block with one mortar cloche, one GFM-A cloche and one GFM-A/B cloche.
- Casemate de Téting: SIngle artillery block with two 75mm gun embrasures and a GFM cloche, located well to the rear.

== Manning ==
The 1940 manning of the ouvrage under the command of Lieutenant Marchelli comprised 125 men and 2 officers of the 146th Fortress Infantry Regiment. The units were under the umbrella of both the 3rd and 4th Armies, Army Group 2. The Casernement de Téting provided peacetime above-ground barracks and support services to Téting and other positions in the area.

== History ==
See Fortified Sector of Faulquemont for a broader discussion of the Faulquemont sector of the Maginot Line.

Following the 15 June 1940 breakthrough by German forces through the Saar gap, the Germans advanced along the rear of the Maginot Line. The German 167th Infantry Division approached Kerfent, Bambesch, Einseling and Téting on 19 June. On 21 June 1940 Téting came under attack from 8.8cm guns. Covering fire from the 81mm mortars of Laudrefang prevented the Germans from directly assaulting Téting. The ouvrage survived until the Second Armistice at Compiègne took effect on 25 June, when it surrendered.

After World War II, Téting was in poor condition and was not chosen for renovation.

== Current condition ==
Téting is abandoned and vandalized, but retains some of its equipment.

== See also ==
- List of all works on Maginot Line
- Siegfried Line
- Atlantic Wall
- Czechoslovak border fortifications

== Bibliography ==
- Allcorn, William. The Maginot Line 1928-45. Oxford: Osprey Publishing, 2003. ISBN 1-84176-646-1
- Kaufmann, J.E. and Kaufmann, H.W. Fortress France: The Maginot Line and French Defenses in World War II, Stackpole Books, 2006. ISBN 0-275-98345-5
- Kaufmann, J.E., Kaufmann, H.W., Jancovič-Potočnik, A. and Lang, P. The Maginot Line: History and Guide, Pen and Sword, 2011. ISBN 978-1-84884-068-3
- Mary, Jean-Yves; Hohnadel, Alain; Sicard, Jacques. Hommes et Ouvrages de la Ligne Maginot, Tome 1. Paris, Histoire & Collections, 2001. ISBN 2-908182-88-2 (in French)
- Mary, Jean-Yves; Hohnadel, Alain; Sicard, Jacques. Hommes et Ouvrages de la Ligne Maginot, Tome 2. Paris, Histoire & Collections, 2003. ISBN 2-908182-97-1 (in French)
- Mary, Jean-Yves; Hohnadel, Alain; Sicard, Jacques. Hommes et Ouvrages de la Ligne Maginot, Tome 3. Paris, Histoire & Collections, 2003. ISBN 2-913903-88-6 (in French)
- Mary, Jean-Yves; Hohnadel, Alain; Sicard, Jacques. Hommes et Ouvrages de la Ligne Maginot, Tome 5. Paris, Histoire & Collections, 2009. ISBN 978-2-35250-127-5 (in French)
