= Ouvrage Bambesch =

- Part of Maginot Line
- Northeast France
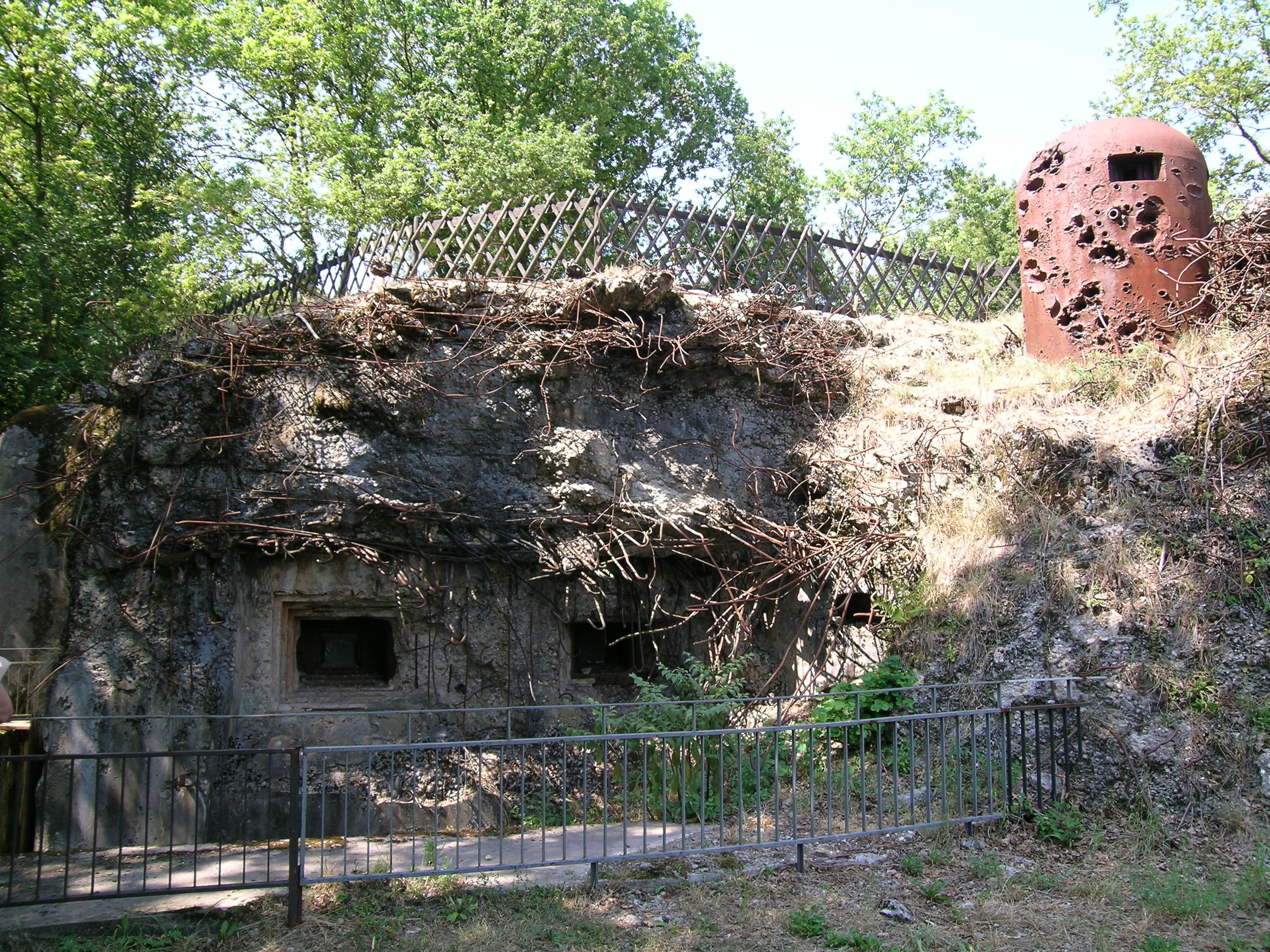
- Bambesch Block 2

Site information
- Owner: Public
- Controlled by: France
- Open to the public: Yes
- Condition: Restored

Location
- Coordinates: 49.11639°N 6.60694°E

Site history
- Materials: Concrete, steel, deep excavation
- Battles/wars: Battle of France

Ouvrage Bambesch is a lesser work (petit ouvrage) of the Maginot Line. Located in the Fortified Sector of Faulquemont, the ouvrage consists of three infantry blocks, and is located between petits ouvrages Kerfent and Einseling, facing Germany. Completed in 1932, it is located in the Bois de Bambesch. On 20 June 1940 during the Battle of France, Bambesch was attacked by German forces, whose artillery battered the position, which could not be effectively supported by its neighbors, into surrender. Since 1973, Bambesch has been operated as a museum and is open to the public.

== Design and construction ==
The site was surveyed by CORF (Commission d'Organisation des Régions Fortifiées), the Maginot Line's design and construction agency, and was approved for construction in October 1931. It was completed at a cost of 11 million francs by the contractor Borie of Paris. The petit ouvrage (Note: English-language sources use the French term ouvrage as the preferred term for the Maginot positions, in preference to "fort", a term usually reserved for older fortifications with passive defenses in the form of walls and ditches. The literal translation of ouvrage in the sense of a fortification in English is "work." A gros ouvrage is a large fortification with a significant artillery component, while a petit ouvrage is smaller, with lighter arms.) was planned for construction in two phases. The second phase was to add an 81mm mortar turret block and a separate entrance block.

== Description ==
Bambesch comprises three infantry blocks. The blocks are linked by deep underground galleries, which also provide space for barracks, utilities and ammunition storage. The galleries are excavated at an average depth of up to 30 metres (98 ft).

- Block 1: Infantry block with one automatic rifle cloche (GFM) and one retractable twin machine gun turret.
- Block 2: Infantry block with one GFM cloches, one grenade launcher cloche (LG), one twin machine gun embrasure and one machine gun/anti-tank gun embrasure (JM/AC47). The GFM cloche has had the concrete blasted from around its base and is pocked by shellfire.
- Block 3: Infantry/entry block with two GFM cloches, one twin machine gun embrasure and one JM/AC47 anti-tank gun embrasure.

Work for the unbuilt second phase included a separate entry blocks and an 81mm mortar turret block.

=== Casemates and shelters ===
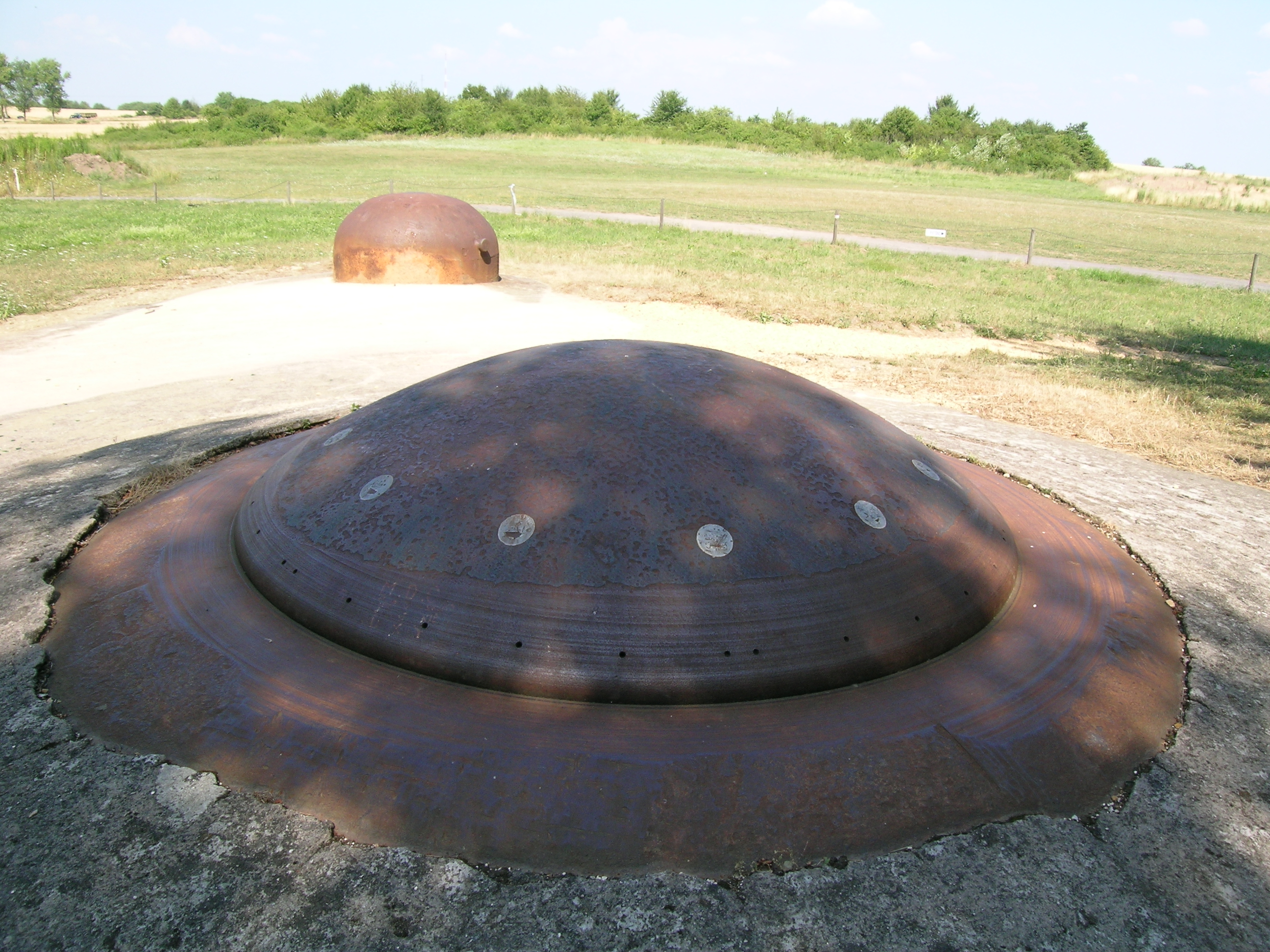
Block 1 machine gun turret

In addition to the connected combat blocks, a series of detached casemates and infantry shelters surround Bambesch, including

- Casemate de Bambiderstroff Nord: SIngle block with one JM/AC47 embrasure, one JM embrasure and one GFM-A/B cloche.
- Casemate de Bambiderstroff Sud: SIngle block with two mortar cloches and one GFM-A/B cloche.
- Casemate de Bambesch: Artillery casemate with two 75mm guns and one GFM cloche, located well to the rear.

== Manning ==
The 1940 manning of the ouvrage under the command of Captain Pastre comprised 102 men and 2 officers of the 156th Fortress Infantry Regiment. The units were under the umbrella of both the 3rd and 4th Armies, Army Group 2. The Casernement de Zimming provided peacetime above-ground barracks and support services to Kerfent and other positions in the area.

== History ==
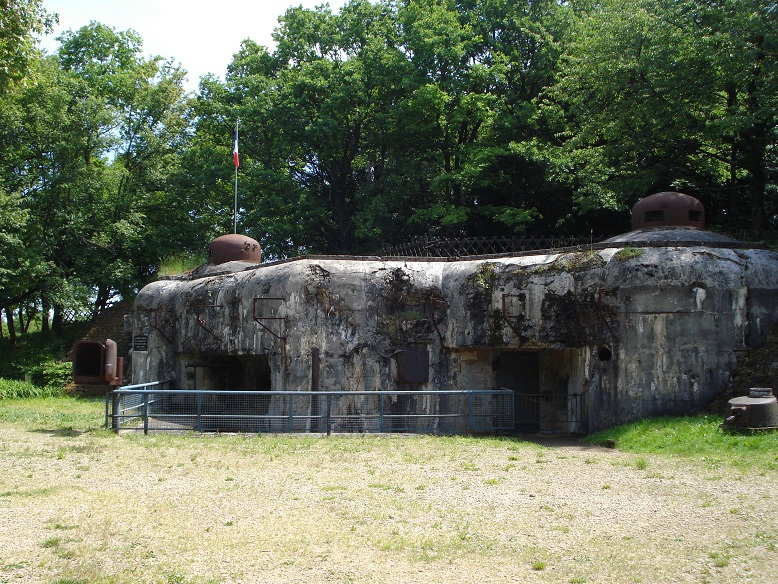
Block 3 in 2011

See Fortified Sector of Faulquemont for a broader discussion of the Faulquemont sector of the Maginot Line.

On 20 June 1940, Bambesch was attacked by German long 88mm guns of the 167th Infantry Division. Block 2 was attacked first, driving the defenders into the underground galleries. With further attacks on Block 3, the defenders risked entrapment and asphyxiation. Despite support from neighboring Kerfent, the attackers could not be dislodged, and after two hours of bombardment, the garrison surrendered.

The fort was stabilized after the war by military engineers and was acquired by the community of Bambiderstroff in 1972, mostly to use the work's well as a municipal water supply. The site was opened to the public on 31 August 1973 by the Association des Guides de Bambesch. The fortification's machinery and equipment have been preserved.

== See also ==
- List of all works on Maginot Line
- Siegfried Line
- Atlantic Wall
- Czechoslovak border fortifications

== Bibliography ==
- Allcorn, William. The Maginot Line 1928-45. Oxford: Osprey Publishing, 2003. ISBN 1-84176-646-1
- Degon, André; Zylberyng, Didier, La Ligne Maginot: Guide des Forts à Visiter, Editions Ouest-France, 2014. ISBN 978-2-7373-6080-0 (in French)
- Kaufmann, J.E. and Kaufmann, H.W. Fortress France: The Maginot Line and French Defenses in World War II, Stackpole Books, 2006. ISBN 0-275-98345-5
- Kaufmann, J.E., Kaufmann, H.W., Jancovič-Potočnik, A. and Lang, P. The Maginot Line: History and Guide, Pen and Sword, 2011. ISBN 978-1-84884-068-3
- Mary, Jean-Yves; Hohnadel, Alain; Sicard, Jacques. Hommes et Ouvrages de la Ligne Maginot, Tome 1. Paris, Histoire & Collections, 2001. ISBN 2-908182-88-2 (in French)
- Mary, Jean-Yves; Hohnadel, Alain; Sicard, Jacques. Hommes et Ouvrages de la Ligne Maginot, Tome 2. Paris, Histoire & Collections, 2003. ISBN 2-908182-97-1 (in French)
- Mary, Jean-Yves; Hohnadel, Alain; Sicard, Jacques. Hommes et Ouvrages de la Ligne Maginot, Tome 3. Paris, Histoire & Collections, 2003. ISBN 2-913903-88-6 (in French)
- Mary, Jean-Yves; Hohnadel, Alain; Sicard, Jacques. Hommes et Ouvrages de la Ligne Maginot, Tome 5. Paris, Histoire & Collections, 2009. ISBN 978-2-35250-127-5 (in French)
