= Ouvrage Einseling =

- Part of Maginot Line
- Northeast France
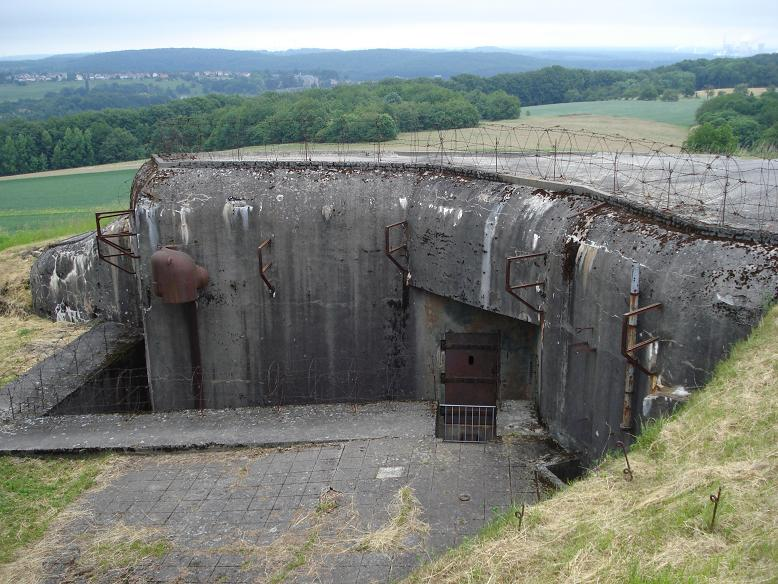

Site information
- Owner: Public
- Controlled by: France
- Open to the public: Yes, surface only
- Condition: Flooded, surface maintained

Location
- Coordinates: 49.10094°N 6.62567°E

Site history
- Materials: Concrete, steel
- Battles/wars: Battle of France

Ouvrage Einseling is a lesser work (petit ouvrage) of the Maginot Line. Located in the Fortified Sector of Faulquemont, the ouvrage consists of one infantry block (béton armé), and is located between petits ouvrages Bambesch and Laudrefang, facing Germany. Einseling faced a determined German attack on 21 June 1940, during the Battle of France. Unlike its less fortunate neighbors to the west, Einseling was able to resist the attack with help from Laudrefang, its neighbor to the east. The ouvrage survives in a heavily battered state, with its lower levels flooded.

== Design and construction ==
The site was surveyed by CORF (Commission d'Organisation des Régions Fortifiées), the Maginot Line's design and construction agency, and was approved for construction in April 1932. It was completed at a cost of 7 million francs by the contractor Borie of Paris. The petit ouvrage (Note: English-language sources use the French term ouvrage as the preferred term for the Maginot positions, in preference to "fort", a term usually reserved for older fortifications with passive defenses in the form of walls and ditches. The literal translation of ouvrage in the sense of a fortification in English is "work." A gros ouvrage is a large fortification with a significant artillery component, while a petit ouvrage is smaller, with lighter arms.) was planned for construction in two phases. The second phase was to add an 81mm mortar turret block and a separate entrance block.

== Description ==
Einseling is built as a single infantry block. The casemate-like ouvrage is armed with two automatic rifle cloches (GFM), two machine gun cloches (JM), one retractable machine gun turret, and one machine gun/anti-tank gun embrasure (JM/AC47).

Work for the unbuilt second phase included a separate entry blocks and an 81mm mortar turret block. The gallery system was to include underground barracks, ammunition storage and a utility area at a depth of about 30 metres (98 ft).

=== Casemates and shelters ===
In addition to the connected combat blocks, a series of detached casemates and infantry shelters surround Bambesch, including

- Casemate d'Einseling Nord: Armored block with one 81mm mortar, one GFM-A and one GFM-A/B cloche.
- Casemate d'Einseling Sud: Armored block with one 81mm mortar and two GFM cloches.

The two casemates flank the main block a few hundred meters to either side. A project to link the casemates to the central block was never started.

- Casemate de Stocken: Artillery casemate with two 75mm guns and one GFM cloche, located well to the rear.

== Manning ==
The 1940 manning of the ouvrage under the command of Lieutenant Vaillant comprised 68 men and 1 officer of the 156th Fortress Infantry Regiment. The units were under the umbrella of both the 3rd and 4th Armies, Army Group 2. The Casernement de Zimming provided peacetime above-ground barracks and support services to Kerfent and other positions in the area.

== History ==
See Fortified Sector of Faulquemont for a broader discussion of the Faulquemont sector of the Maginot Line.

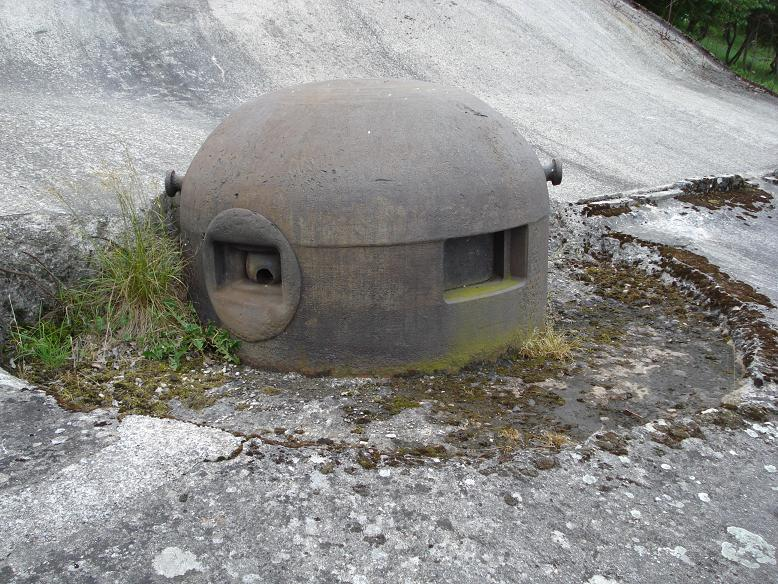
Machine gun cloche

Following the 15 June 1940 breakthrough by German forces through the Saar gap, the Germans advanced along the rear of the Maginot Line. The German 167th Infantry Division approached Kerfent, Bambesch, Einseling and Téting on 19 June. On the 20th the Germans successfully assaulted Bambesch, which was not within the reach of heavy French artillery. The following day the Wehrmacht attacked Einseling, which was more fortunate, as it was within range of Laudrefang's 81mm mortars. Laudrefang's fire, along with accurate fire from Einseling's lighter weapons, broke up a German artillery attack. The ouvrage survived until the Second Armistice at Compiègne took effect on 25 June, when it surrendered. After World War II, Einseling was in poor condition and was not chosen for renovation.

The surface of the ouvrage has been cleaned up by local residents and may be visited. The lower levels are flooded with water.

== See also ==
- List of all works on Maginot Line
- Siegfried Line
- Atlantic Wall
- Czechoslovak border fortifications

== Bibliography ==
- Allcorn, William. The Maginot Line 1928-45. Oxford: Osprey Publishing, 2003. ISBN 1-84176-646-1
- Kaufmann, J.E. and Kaufmann, H.W. Fortress France: The Maginot Line and French Defenses in World War II, Stackpole Books, 2006. ISBN 0-275-98345-5
- Kaufmann, J.E., Kaufmann, H.W., Jancovič-Potočnik, A. and Lang, P. The Maginot Line: History and Guide, Pen and Sword, 2011. ISBN 978-1-84884-068-3
- Mary, Jean-Yves; Hohnadel, Alain; Sicard, Jacques. Hommes et Ouvrages de la Ligne Maginot, Tome 1. Paris, Histoire & Collections, 2001. ISBN 2-908182-88-2 (in French)
- Mary, Jean-Yves; Hohnadel, Alain; Sicard, Jacques. Hommes et Ouvrages de la Ligne Maginot, Tome 2. Paris, Histoire & Collections, 2003. ISBN 2-908182-97-1 (in French)
- Mary, Jean-Yves; Hohnadel, Alain; Sicard, Jacques. Hommes et Ouvrages de la Ligne Maginot, Tome 3. Paris, Histoire & Collections, 2003. ISBN 2-913903-88-6 (in French)
- Mary, Jean-Yves; Hohnadel, Alain; Sicard, Jacques. Hommes et Ouvrages de la Ligne Maginot, Tome 5. Paris, Histoire & Collections, 2009. ISBN 978-2-35250-127-5 (in French)
