= Ouvrage Laudrefang =

- Part of Maginot Line
- Northeast France
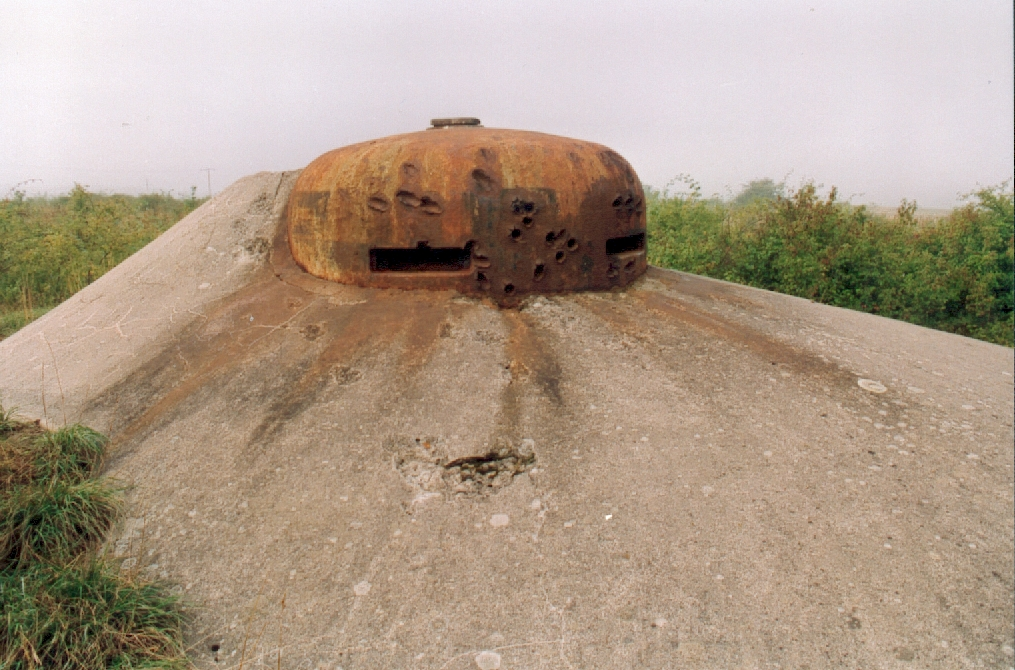
- Block 5 with cloche

Site information
- Controlled by: France

Location
- Coordinates: 49.08936°N 6.64803°E

Site history
- In use: Abandoned
- Materials: Concrete, steel, deep excavation
- Battles/wars: Battle of France

Ouvrage Laudrefang is a lesser work (petit ouvrage) of the Maginot Line. Located in the Fortified Sector of Faulquemont, the ouvrage consists of one infantry block, and is located between petits ouvrages Einseling and Teting, facing Germany. Laudrefang was originally planned as a gros ouvrage. With a heavy armament for a petit ouvrage it successfully defended its neighbors against German attack during the Battle of France. Laudrefang is abandoned and flooded, and was heavily damaged by German bombardment in 1940.

== Design and construction ==
The site was surveyed by CORF (Commission d'Organisation des Régions Fortifiées), the Maginot Line's design and construction agency, and was approved for construction in August 1931. It was completed at a cost of 24 million francs by the contractor Générale des Travaux Publics. The petit ouvrage (Note: English-language sources use the French term ouvrage as the preferred term for the Maginot positions, in preference to "fort", a term usually reserved for older fortifications with passive defenses in the form of walls and ditches. The literal translation of ouvrage in the sense of a fortification in English is "work." A gros ouvrage is a large fortification with a significant artillery component, while a petit ouvrage is smaller, with lighter arms.) was originally planned as a gros ouvrage with fourteen blocks The project was scaled back, and Block 3 was not connected to the main ouvrage. A second phase was to connect it, and to provide a separate entrance block. Even as a petit ouvrage it mounted the heaviest armament in its sector, with 81mm mortars.

== Description ==
Laudrefang comprises five infantry blocks. Blocks 1, 2 4 and 5 are linked by deep underground galleries, which also provide space for barracks, utilities and ammunition storage. The galleries are excavated at an average depth of up to 30 metres (98 ft).

- Block 1: Infantry block with two automatic rifle cloches (GFM), one twin machine gun embrasure (JM), two 81mm mortar embrasures and one machine gun/anti-tank gun embrasure (JM/AC47). The two-level block was heavily damaged by German shellfire.
- Block 2: Infantry block with two GFM cloches and one retractable twin machine gun turret.
- Block 3: Infantry block with two GFM cloches, one retractable twin machine gun turret, one twin machine gun embrasure, two 81mm mortar embrasures and one JM/AC47 anti-tank gun embrasure. The mortars are on a lower level, firing out of the ditch in front of the embrasures.
- Block 4: Infantry/emergency exit block with two GFM cloches and one grenade launcher cloche (LG).
- Block 5: Infantry block with one GFM cloche and one observation cloche (VDP). The block and cloches show the marks of German attack.

The unbuilt blocks of the gros ouvrage would have included separate personnel and munitions entries, two 75mm gun turrets and a 135mm gun turret.

=== Casemates and shelters ===
In addition to the connected combat blocks, a series of detached casemates and infantry shelters surround Laudrefang, including

- Casemate des Quatre-Vents Nord: Armored block with one mortar cloche and one mortar cloche modified to AM standard.
- Casemate des Quatre-Vents Sud: SIngle block with one JM/AC47 embrasure, one JM embrasure, one GFM-A cloche and one GFM-A/B cloche.

== Manning ==
The 1940 manning of the ouvrage under the command of Captain Gustave Cattiaux comprised 267 men and 8 officers of the 156th Fortress Infantry Regiment. The units were under the umbrella of both the 3rd and 4th Armies, Army Group 2. The Casernement de Zimming provided peacetime above-ground barracks and support services to Laudrefang and other positions in the area.

== History ==
See Fortified Sector of Faulquemont for a broader discussion of the Faulquemont sector of the Maginot Line.

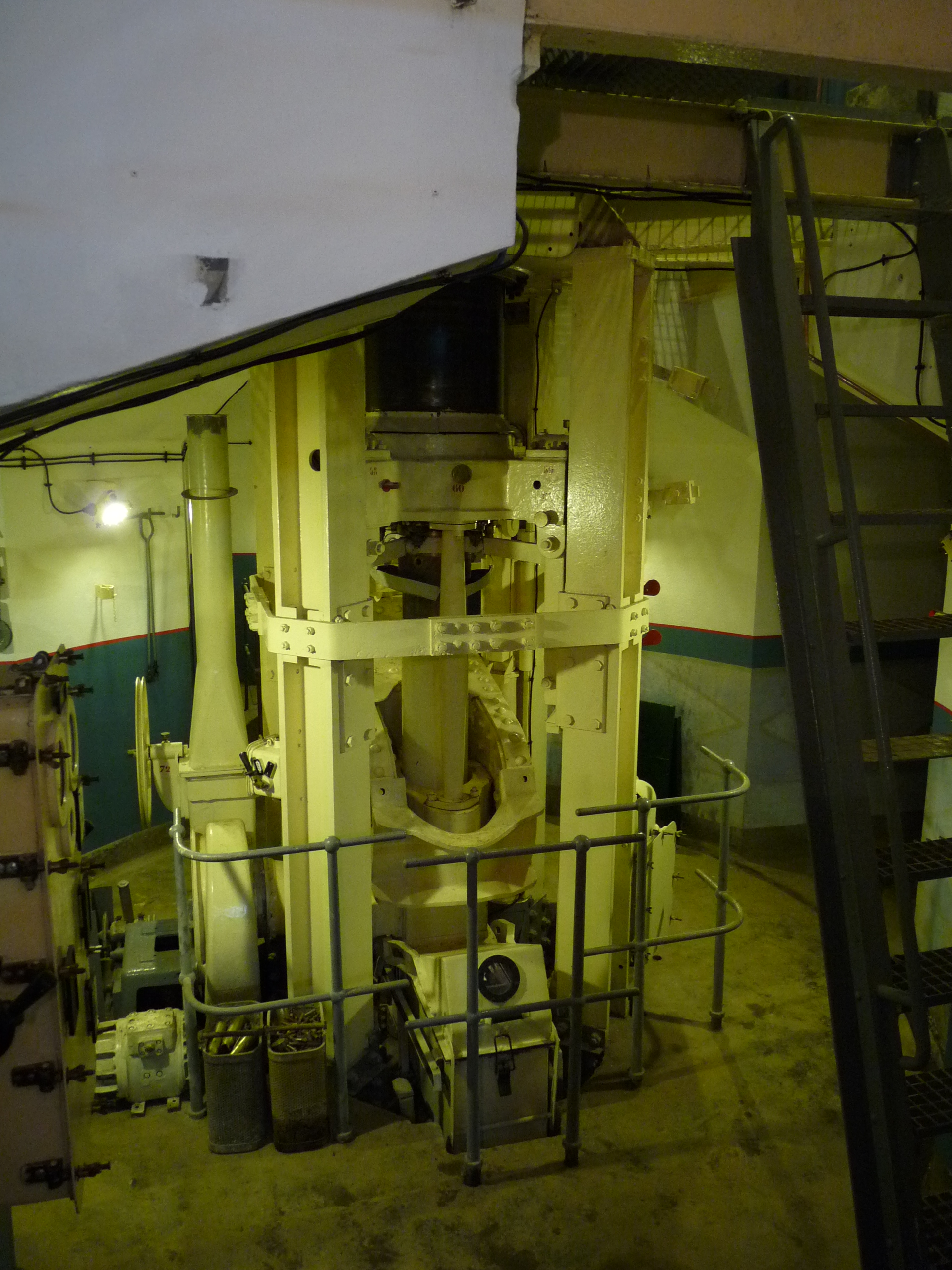
Block 3 machine gun turret machinery

Following the 15 June 1940 breakthrough by German forces through the Saar gap, the Germans advanced along the rear of the Maginot Line. The German 167th Infantry Division approached Kerfent, Bambesch, Einseling and Téting on 19 June. On 21 June 1940 Laudrefang supported neighboring ouvrages Einseling and Teting as they came under attack with an estimated 5000 81mm mortar rounds. The covering fire prevented the Germans from taking either. The German infantry attacks were suspended in favor of an artillery barrage at Laudrefang, firing between 3000 and 3500 rounds at the ouvrage. Compared to other German attacks on other ouvrages, the bombardment of Laudrefang was relatively ineffectual. While the concrete structure was badly damaged, it was not perforated, and the mortar turrets and cloches were not hit. The ouvrage survived until the Second Armistice at Compiègne took effect on 25 June, when it surrendered. The machine gun turret at Block 3 was used for testing of shaped-charge munitions.

After World War II, Laudrefang was in poor condition and was not chosen for renovation.

== Current condition ==
The lower levels of Laudrefang are flooded by groundwater, and the entire ouvrage is abandoned.

== See also ==
- List of all works on Maginot Line
- Siegfried Line
- Atlantic Wall
- Czechoslovak border fortifications

== Bibliography ==
- Allcorn, William. The Maginot Line 1928-45. Oxford: Osprey Publishing, 2003. ISBN 1-84176-646-1
- Kaufmann, J.E. and Kaufmann, H.W. Fortress France: The Maginot Line and French Defenses in World War II, Stackpole Books, 2006. ISBN 0-275-98345-5
- Kaufmann, J.E., Kaufmann, H.W., Jancovič-Potočnik, A. and Lang, P. The Maginot Line: History and Guide, Pen and Sword, 2011. ISBN 978-1-84884-068-3
- Mary, Jean-Yves; Hohnadel, Alain; Sicard, Jacques. Hommes et Ouvrages de la Ligne Maginot, Tome 1. Paris, Histoire & Collections, 2001. ISBN 2-908182-88-2 (in French)
- Mary, Jean-Yves; Hohnadel, Alain; Sicard, Jacques. Hommes et Ouvrages de la Ligne Maginot, Tome 2. Paris, Histoire & Collections, 2003. ISBN 2-908182-97-1 (in French)
- Mary, Jean-Yves; Hohnadel, Alain; Sicard, Jacques. Hommes et Ouvrages de la Ligne Maginot, Tome 3. Paris, Histoire & Collections, 2003. ISBN 2-913903-88-6 (in French)
- Mary, Jean-Yves; Hohnadel, Alain; Sicard, Jacques. Hommes et Ouvrages de la Ligne Maginot, Tome 5. Paris, Histoire & Collections, 2009. ISBN 978-2-35250-127-5 (in French)
