= Ouvrage Mottenberg =

Ouvrage of the Maginot Line

Ouvrage Mottemberg
- Part of Maginot Line
- Northeast France
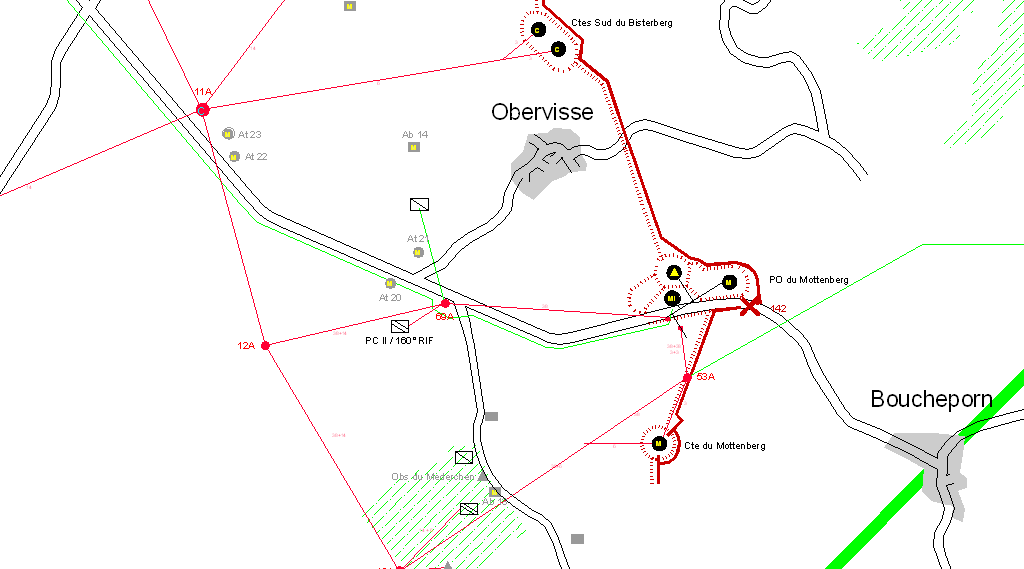
- Ouvrage Mottenberg carte

Site information
- Controlled by: France

Location
- Coordinates: 49.1475°N 6.59444°E

Site history
- In use: Abandoned
- Materials: Concrete, steel, deep excavation
- Battles/wars: Battle of France

Ouvrage Mottenberg is a lesser work (petit ouvrage) of the Maginot Line. Part of the Fortified Sector of Boulay, the ouvrage consists of one entrance block and two infantry blocks, and is located between petits ouvrages Coume Annexe Sud and Kerfent, facing Germany.

== Design and construction ==
The site was surveyed by CORF (Commission d'Organisation des Régions Fortifiées), the Maginot Line's design and construction agency; Mottenberg was approved for construction in September 1931. It was completed at a cost of 13 million francs by the contractor Societé Alsacienne des Travaux Publics. The petit ouvrage (Note: English-language sources use the French term ouvrage as the preferred term for the Maginot positions, in preference to "fort", a term usually reserved for older fortifications with passive defensives in the form of walls and ditches. The literal translation of ouvrage in the sense of a fortification in English is "work." A gros ouvrage is a large fortification with a significant artillery component, while a petit ouvrage is smaller, with lighter arms.) was to receive a separate entrance block, an 81mm mortar turret and a 135mm gun turret in a second phase, never carried out

== Description ==
Mottenberg comprises three infantry blocks. The blocks are linked by deep underground galleries, which also provide space for barracks, utilities and ammunition storage. The galleries are excavated at an average depth of up to 30 metres (98 ft).

- Block 1: infantry/entry block with two automatic rifle cloches (GFM), one observation cloche (VDP), one twin machine gun embrasure and one machine gun/anti-tank gun embrasure (JM/AC47).
- Block 2: Infantry block with one GFM cloche and one JM cloche.
- Block 3: Infantry block with one GFM cloche and one retractable twin machine gun turret.

The second phase of construction was to add an 81mm mortar turret block, a 135mm gun turret block and an entry block, as well as underground support facilities.

=== Casemates and shelters ===
In addition to the connected combat blocks, a series of detached casemates and infantry shelters surround Mottenberg, including

- Casemate Sud du Mottenberg: Double block with two JM/AC47 embrasures, one JM embrasure, one 81mm mortar embrasure and two GFM cloches. Destroyed in 1940 by German assault.

== Manning ==
The 1940 manning of the ouvrage under the command of Captain Cloarec comprised 145 men and 3 officers of the 160th Fortress Infantry Regiment. The units were under the umbrella of the 3rd Army, Army Group 2. The Casernement de Ban Saint-Jean provided peacetime above-ground barracks and support services to Coume and other positions in the area.

== History ==
See Fortified Sector of Boulay for a broader discussion of the Boulay sector of the Maginot Line.

On 21 June 1940, Mottenberg fired on German troops attacking petit ouvrage Kerfent. Since Mottenberg was only able to use machine gun fire, the intervention was unsuccessful and Kerfent surrendered. After World War II, Mottenberg was in poor condition and was not chosen for renovation.

== Current condition ==
All above-ground elements such as cloches and turrets have been salvaged, with few other elements visible.

== See also ==
- List of all works on Maginot Line
- Siegfried Line
- Atlantic Wall
- Czechoslovak border fortifications

== Bibliography ==
- Allcorn, William. The Maginot Line 1928-45. Oxford: Osprey Publishing, 2003. ISBN 1-84176-646-1
- Kaufmann, J.E. and Kaufmann, H.W. Fortress France: The Maginot Line and French Defenses in World War II, Stackpole Books, 2006. ISBN 0-275-98345-5
- Kaufmann, J.E., Kaufmann, H.W., Jancovič-Potočnik, A. and Lang, P. The Maginot Line: History and Guide, Pen and Sword, 2011. ISBN 978-1-84884-068-3
- Mary, Jean-Yves; Hohnadel, Alain; Sicard, Jacques. Hommes et Ouvrages de la Ligne Maginot, Tome 1. Paris, Histoire & Collections, 2001. ISBN 2-908182-88-2 (in French)
- Mary, Jean-Yves; Hohnadel, Alain; Sicard, Jacques. Hommes et Ouvrages de la Ligne Maginot, Tome 2. Paris, Histoire & Collections, 2003. ISBN 2-908182-97-1 (in French)
- Mary, Jean-Yves; Hohnadel, Alain; Sicard, Jacques. Hommes et Ouvrages de la Ligne Maginot, Tome 3. Paris, Histoire & Collections, 2003. ISBN 2-913903-88-6 (in French)
- Mary, Jean-Yves; Hohnadel, Alain; Sicard, Jacques. Hommes et Ouvrages de la Ligne Maginot, Tome 5. Paris, Histoire & Collections, 2009. ISBN 978-2-35250-127-5 (in French)
