= Ouvrage Coume =

Fortifications of the Maginot line

- Part of Maginot Line
- Northeast France

Site information
- Controlled by: France

Location
- Location within France
- Coordinates: 49.18306°N 6.58583°E

Site history
- In use: Abandoned
- Materials: Concrete, steel, deep excavation
- Battles/wars: Battle of France

Ouvrage Coume is a lesser work (petit ouvrage) of the Maginot Line. Located in the Fortified Sector of Boulay, the ouvrage consists of two infantry blocks, and was located between petits ouvrages Coume Annexe Nord and Coume Annexe Sud, facing Germany.

== Design and construction ==
The site was surveyed by CORF (Commission d'Organisation des Régions Fortifiées), the Maginot Line's design and construction agency; Coume was approved for construction in early 1931. It was completed at a cost of 7 million francs by the contractor Duval-Weyrich of Nancy. The petit ouvrage (Note: English-language sources use the French term ouvrage as the preferred term for the Maginot positions, in preference to "fort", a term usually reserved for older fortifications with passive defensives in the form of walls and ditches. The literal translation of ouvrage in the sense of a fortification in English is "work." A gros ouvrage is a large fortification with a significant artillery component, while a petit ouvrage is smaller, with lighter arms.) was originally planned as a gros ouvrage with twelve combat blocks, mounting artillery. The project was progressively scaled back to the point that the two infantry blocks that were actually built were not even connected by an underground gallery. A second phase was planned to link the two, never carried out.

== Description ==
Coume comprises two unconnected infantry blocks. A subterranean connection was planned for Phase 2, and was started but not completed before the outbreak of war:

- Block 1: infantry/entry block with two automatic rifle cloches (GFM), one twin machine gun embrasure and one machine gun/anti-tank gun embrasure (JM/AC47).
- Block 2: Infantry block with two GFM cloches, one retractable twin machine gun turret, one twin machine gun embrasure and one JM/AC47 embrasure.

The original gros ouvrage was to include two casemate blocks, each with three 75mm guns, a block with a 135mm gun turret, three casemates covering an anti-tank ditch, and a block with an 81mm mortar turret. Separate blocks were planned for the rear for munitions and personnel entry, while the deep underground gallery system was to include barracks and a large "M1" magazine.

== Manning ==
The 1940 manning of the ouvrage under the command of Lieutenant Soubrier comprised 95 men and 2 officers of the 160th Fortress Infantry Regiment. The units were under the umbrella of the 3rd Army, Army Group 2. The Casernement de Ban Saint-Jean provided peacetime above-ground barracks and support services to Coume and other positions in the area.

== History ==
See Fortified Sector of Boulay for a broader discussion of the Boulay sector of the Maginot Line.

Coume played no significant role in either the Battle of France in 1940 or the Lorraine Campaign of 1944.

== See also ==
- List of all works on Maginot Line
- Siegfried Line
- Atlantic Wall
- Czechoslovak border fortifications

== Bibliography ==
- Allcorn, William. The Maginot Line 1928-45. Oxford: Osprey Publishing, 2003. ISBN 1-84176-646-1
- Kaufmann, J.E. and Kaufmann, H.W. Fortress France: The Maginot Line and French Defenses in World War II, Stackpole Books, 2006. ISBN 0-275-98345-5
- Kaufmann, J.E., Kaufmann, H.W., Jancovič-Potočnik, A. and Lang, P. The Maginot Line: History and Guide, Pen and Sword, 2011. ISBN 978-1-84884-068-3
- Mary, Jean-Yves; Hohnadel, Alain; Sicard, Jacques. Hommes et Ouvrages de la Ligne Maginot, Tome 1. Paris, Histoire & Collections, 2001. ISBN 2-908182-88-2 (in French)
- Mary, Jean-Yves; Hohnadel, Alain; Sicard, Jacques. Hommes et Ouvrages de la Ligne Maginot, Tome 2. Paris, Histoire & Collections, 2003. ISBN 2-908182-97-1 (in French)
- Mary, Jean-Yves; Hohnadel, Alain; Sicard, Jacques. Hommes et Ouvrages de la Ligne Maginot, Tome 3. Paris, Histoire & Collections, 2003. ISBN 2-913903-88-6 (in French)
- Mary, Jean-Yves; Hohnadel, Alain; Sicard, Jacques. Hommes et Ouvrages de la Ligne Maginot, Tome 5. Paris, Histoire & Collections, 2009. ISBN 978-2-35250-127-5 (in French)
