= Ouvrage Coume Annexe Sud =

Ouvrage of the Maginot Line

- Part of Maginot Line
- Northeast France
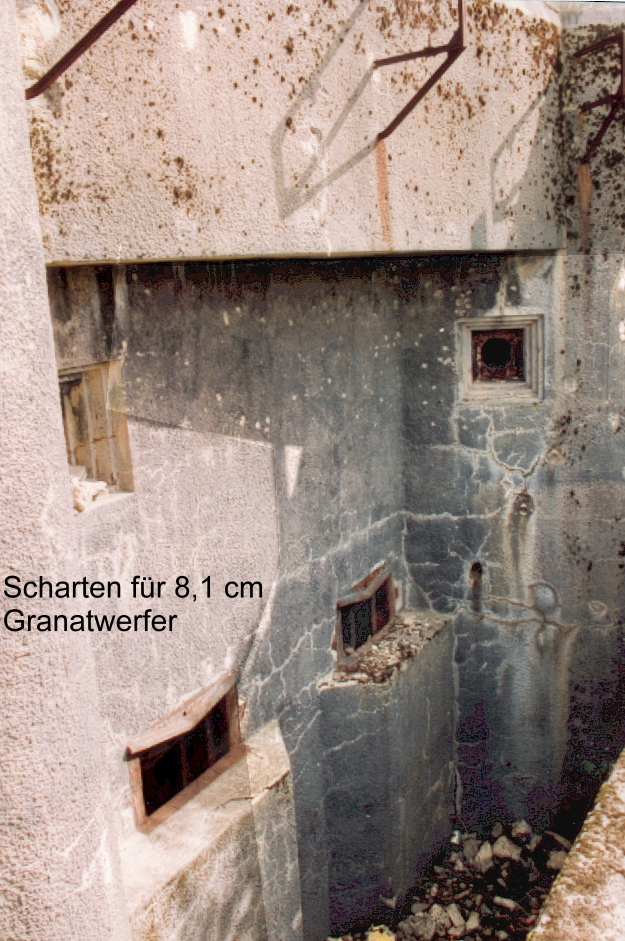
- Block 3 with 81mm mortar embrasures on lower level

Site information
- Controlled by: France

Location
- Location within France
- Coordinates: 49.17278°N 6.58972°E

Site history
- In use: Abandoned
- Materials: Concrete, steel, deep excavation
- Battles/wars: Battle of France

Ouvrage Coume Annexe Sud is a lesser work (petit ouvrage) of the Maginot Line. Located in the Fortified Sector of Boulay, the ouvrage consists of two infantry blocks, one artillery block and one observation block, and is located between petits ouvrages Coume and Mottemberg, facing Germany.

== Design and construction ==
The site was surveyed by CORF (Commission d'Organisation des Régions Fortifiées), the Maginot Line's design and construction agency; Coume was approved for construction in May 1931. It was completed at a cost of 13 million francs. The petit ouvrage (Note: English-language sources use the French term ouvrage as the preferred term for the Maginot positions, in preference to "fort", a term usually reserved for older fortifications with passive defensives in the form of walls and ditches. The literal translation of ouvrage in the sense of a fortification in English is "work." A gros ouvrage is a large fortification with a significant artillery component, while a petit ouvrage is smaller, with lighter arms.) was to receive a separate entry block in a second phase, never carried out.

== Description ==
Coume Annexe Sud comprises four infantry blocks, connected by underground galleries, with a small underground utility area and barracks. The galleries are excavated at an average depth of up to 30 metres (98 ft).

- Block 1: Infantry block with one automatic rifle cloche (GFM) and one twin machine gun cloche (JM).
- Block 2: Infantry block with one GFM cloche, one grenade launcher cloche (LG) and one twin machine gun cloche (JM).
- Block 3: Entry/infantry block with two GFM cloches, one twin machine gun embrasure, one JM/AC47 embrasure and two 81mm mortar embrasures.
- Block 4: Infantry/observation block with one GFM cloche, one JM cloche and one observation cloche (VDP).

=== Casemates and shelters ===
In addition to the connected combat blocks, a series of detached casemates and infantry shelters surround Coume Annexe Sud, including

- Casemate du Bisterberg Nord I: SIngle armored block with two mortar cloches and one GFM cloche.
- Casemate du Bisterberg Nord II: SIngle block with one JM/AC47 embrasure, one JM embrasure and one GFM cloche.
- Casemate du Bisterberg Sud III: SIngle block with one JM/AC47 embrasure, one JM embrasure and one GFM cloche.
- Casemate du Bisterberg Sud IIII: SIngle block with one JM/AC47 embrasure, one JM embrasure and one GFM cloche.

== Manning ==
The 1940 manning of the ouvrage under the command of Captain Faucoulanche comprised 194 men and 5 officers of the 160th Fortress Infantry Regiment. The units were under the umbrella of the 3rd Army, Army Group 2. The Casernement de Ban Saint-Jean provided peacetime above-ground barracks and support services to Coume Annexe Sudand other positions in the area.

== History ==
See Fortified Sector of Boulay for a broader discussion of the Boulay sector of the Maginot Line.

Coume Annexe Sud played no significant role in either the Battle of France in 1940 or the Lorraine Campaign of 1944.

== See also ==
- List of all works on Maginot Line
- Siegfried Line
- Atlantic Wall
- Czechoslovak border fortifications

== Bibliography ==
- Allcorn, William. The Maginot Line 1928-45. Oxford: Osprey Publishing, 2003. ISBN 1-84176-646-1
- Kaufmann, J.E. and Kaufmann, H.W. Fortress France: The Maginot Line and French Defenses in World War II, Stackpole Books, 2006. ISBN 0-275-98345-5
- Kaufmann, J.E., Kaufmann, H.W., Jancovič-Potočnik, A. and Lang, P. The Maginot Line: History and Guide, Pen and Sword, 2011. ISBN 978-1-84884-068-3
- Mary, Jean-Yves; Hohnadel, Alain; Sicard, Jacques. Hommes et Ouvrages de la Ligne Maginot, Tome 1. Paris, Histoire & Collections, 2001. ISBN 2-908182-88-2 (in French)
- Mary, Jean-Yves; Hohnadel, Alain; Sicard, Jacques. Hommes et Ouvrages de la Ligne Maginot, Tome 2. Paris, Histoire & Collections, 2003. ISBN 2-908182-97-1 (in French)
- Mary, Jean-Yves; Hohnadel, Alain; Sicard, Jacques. Hommes et Ouvrages de la Ligne Maginot, Tome 3. Paris, Histoire & Collections, 2003. ISBN 2-913903-88-6 (in French)
- Mary, Jean-Yves; Hohnadel, Alain; Sicard, Jacques. Hommes et Ouvrages de la Ligne Maginot, Tome 5. Paris, Histoire & Collections, 2009. ISBN 978-2-35250-127-5 (in French)
