= Ouvrage Kerfent =

- Part of Maginot Line
- Northeast France
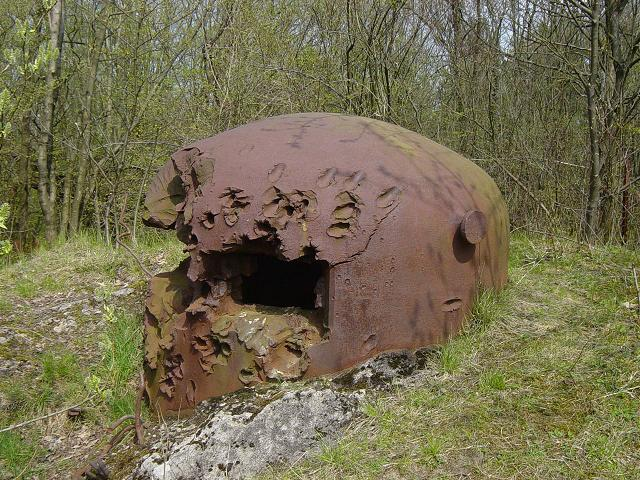
- Damaged Block 2 cloche at Kerfent

Site information
- Owner: Commune of Zimming
- Controlled by: France

Location
- Coordinates: 49.12583°N 6.57889°E

Site history
- In use: Abandoned
- Materials: Concrete, steel, deep excavation
- Battles/wars: Battle of France

Ouvrage Kerfent is a lesser work (petit ouvrage) of the Maginot Line. Located in the Fortified Sector of Faulquemont, the ouvrage consists of three infantry blocks and an observation block, and is located between petits ouvrages Mottemberg and Bambesch, facing Germany. During the Battle of France, Kerfent was attacked by German forces, who captured the position from the rear after a short assault with artillery support. The combat blocks were heavily damaged. During the Cold War, limited repairs were made to allow the underground facilities to be occupied. Between 1958 and 1961 the site was used by the Royal Canadian Air Force as a microwave communications relay station. In the 1970s the ouvrage was sold to the commune of Zimming. The ouvrage is now flooded.

== Design and construction ==
The site was surveyed by the Commission d'Organisation des Régions Fortifiées (CORF), the Maginot Line's design and construction agency, and was approved for construction in October 1931. It was completed at a cost of 16 million francs by the contractor Borie of Paris. The petit ouvrage (Note: English-language sources use the French term ouvrage as the preferred term for the Maginot positions, in preference to "fort", a term usually reserved for older fortifications with passive defenses in the form of walls and ditches. The literal translation of ouvrage in the sense of a fortification in English is "work." A gros ouvrage is a large fortification with a significant artillery component, while a petit ouvrage is smaller, with lighter arms.) was planned for construction in two phases. The second phase was to upgrade the petit ouvrage to a gros ouvrage with artillery blocks.

== Description ==
Kerfent comprises three infantry blocks and a distant observation block. The blocks are linked by deep underground galleries, which also provide space for barracks, utilities and ammunition storage. The galleries are excavated at an average depth of up to 30 metres (98 ft).

- Block 1: Infantry block with one automatic rifle cloche (GFM) and one retractable twin machine gun turret.
- Block 2: Infantry block with two GFM cloches, one grenade launcher cloche (LG), one twin machine gun embrasure and one machine gun/anti-tank gun embrasure (JM/AC47).
- Block 3: Infantry block with two GFM cloches, one twin machine gun turret and one JM/AC47 anti-tank gun embrasure.
- Block 4: Observation block with two GFM cloches and one GFM/observation cloche, at a distance of 514 metres (1,686 ft) from the main ouvrage.

Work for the unbuilt second phase included two separate entry blocks for munitions and personnel, two casemates, each with three 75mm guns, one 75mm gun turret block, one 81mm mortar turret block and one 135mm gun turret block.

== Manning ==
The 1940 manning of the ouvrage under the command of Captain Broché comprised 161 men and 2 officers of the 156th Fortress Infantry Regiment. The units were under the umbrella of both the 3rd and 4th Armies, Army Group 2. The Casernement de Zimming provided peacetime above-ground barracks and support services to Kerfent and other positions in the area.

== History ==
See Fortified Sector of Faulquemont for a broader discussion of the Faulquemont sector of the Maginot Line.

=== 1940 ===
Following the 15 June 1940 breakthrough by German forces through the Saar gap, the Germans advanced along the rear of the Maginot Line. The German 167th Infantry Division approached Kerfent, Bambesch, Einseling and Téting on 19 June. On the 20th the Germans assaulted Bambesch. Supporting fire from Kerfent was of limited use, since the petit ouvrage did not mount heavy weapons. Bambesch surrendered at 1900 hours. The following day the Wehrmacht attacked Kerfent with 88mm high velocity gunfire from a battery positioned atop Bambesch. Kerfent's cloches were hit by direct fire and Block 3 had to be abandoned after it was holed. The German batteries approached to within 100 metres (330 ft) to attack Block 2. Despite machine gun support from neighboring Mottemberg, Kerfent was forced to surrender.

=== 1944 ===
Kerfent did not see significant action during the Lorraine Campaign of 1944, but the observation block's cloche was used for weapons tests by the Americans.

=== Cold War ===
After the war, Kerfent's combat blocks were mostly left in their damaged state, but the underground facilities were cleaned and maintained. From 1958 to 1961, prior to France's withdrawal from the NATO integrated command structure in the mid-1960s, Kerfent's underground facilities and open surface areas were used by the Canadian 601st Communications Squadron as a communications center, supporting RCAF Station Grostenquin. A microwave antenna was erected on Block 2. By 1970, Kerfent was listed for disposal, and was acquired by the commune of Zimming. The military antenna was replaced by a civil television antenna.

== Current condition ==
A volunteer group has been organized to interpret the ouvrage to the public. However, the underground portions remain flooded with up to a metre of water, and the galleries are not safely accessible.

== See also ==
- List of all works on Maginot Line
- Siegfried Line
- Atlantic Wall
- Czechoslovak border fortifications

== Bibliography ==
- Allcorn, William. The Maginot Line 1928-45. Oxford: Osprey Publishing, 2003. ISBN 1-84176-646-1
- Kaufmann, J.E. and Kaufmann, H.W. Fortress France: The Maginot Line and French Defenses in World War II, Stackpole Books, 2006. ISBN 0-275-98345-5
- Kaufmann, J.E., Kaufmann, H.W., Jancovič-Potočnik, A. and Lang, P. The Maginot Line: History and Guide, Pen and Sword, 2011. ISBN 978-1-84884-068-3
- Mary, Jean-Yves; Hohnadel, Alain; Sicard, Jacques. Hommes et Ouvrages de la Ligne Maginot, Tome 1. Paris, Histoire & Collections, 2001. ISBN 2-908182-88-2 (in French)
- Mary, Jean-Yves; Hohnadel, Alain; Sicard, Jacques. Hommes et Ouvrages de la Ligne Maginot, Tome 2. Paris, Histoire & Collections, 2003. ISBN 2-908182-97-1 (in French)
- Mary, Jean-Yves; Hohnadel, Alain; Sicard, Jacques. Hommes et Ouvrages de la Ligne Maginot, Tome 3. Paris, Histoire & Collections, 2003. ISBN 2-913903-88-6 (in French)
- Mary, Jean-Yves; Hohnadel, Alain; Sicard, Jacques. Hommes et Ouvrages de la Ligne Maginot, Tome 5. Paris, Histoire & Collections, 2009. ISBN 978-2-35250-127-5 (in French)
