= Wolf-Günther Trierenberg =

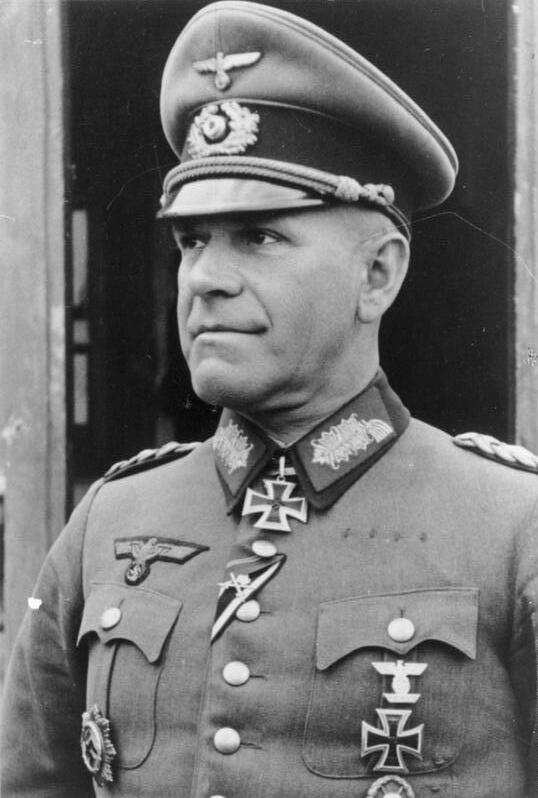
- Born: 18 July 1891
- Died: 25 July 1981 (aged 90)
- Military career
- Allegiance: Nazi Germany
- Branch: Army (Wehrmacht)
- Rank: Generalleutnant
- Commands: 167th Infantry Division; 347th Infantry Division
- Conflicts: World War II
- Awards: Knight's Cross of the Iron Cross

Wolf-Günther Trierenberg (18 June 1891 – 25 July 1981) was a German general during World War II who commanded several divisions. He was also a recipient of the Knight's Cross of the Iron Cross of Nazi Germany. In February–March 1945 he commanded the 347th Infantry Division in the defense of Saarbrücken.

== Awards and decorations ==
- Knight's Cross of the Iron Cross on 10 May 1943 as Generalleutnant and commander of 167th Infantry Division
