= 920th Field Artillery Battalion (United States) =

The 920th Field Artillery Battalion was a U.S. Army artillery unit that fought in World War II. The battalion was attached to the U.S. 95th Infantry Division when activated, in July 1942.
