= 347th Infantry Division =

347th Infantry Division 347th Volksgrenadier Division
- 347. Infanterie-Division; 347. Volksgrenadier-Division
- Active: 1942 – 1945
- Country: Nazi Germany
- Branch: Army
- Type: Infantry (1943 – 1945); Volksgrenadier (1945)
- Size: Division
- Engagements: Second World War

The 347th Infantry Division (German: 347. Infanterie-Division) was an infantry division of the German Army during the Second World War, active from 1942 to 1945. Initially based in the Netherlands, it saw active service on the Western Front and was redesignated as a Volksgrenadier division in May 1945.

== Operational history ==
The 347th Infantry Division was formed in September 1942 as a static division of two regiments of fortress infantry. Under the command of Generalleutnant (Note: In the Wehrmacht, the rank of generalleutnant was equivalent to that of major general in the United States Army.) Friedrich Bayer, the following month it was sent to the Netherlands to the coastline near Amsterdam and its original two regiments later each received an infantry battalion of volunteer troops from Turkestan and the Caucasus. It remained here for several months until after the Invasion of Normandy.

Now commanded by Generalleutnant Wolf Trierenberg, the division was then transferred to France to reinforce Army Group B which was engaged in the fighting in Normandy. It gradually retreated into Belgium and was involved in the fighting along the Siegfried Line. By September it had been reduced to a Kampfgruppe and the following month it received reinforcements in the form of training battalions from the 526th Replacement Division. The 880th Infantry Regiment was also attached to the division. It continued to be engaged on the Western Front, including the Battle of Hürtgen Forest.

The division was then involved in the defense of Saarbrücken. In March 1945, a new divisional commander, Generalleutnant Maximilian Siry took over from Trierenberg but his time in command was brief. On 10 April he became trapped and surrendered to Allied troops. Trierenberg returned to command the division, which was now in Thuringia. It was designated a Volksgrenadier division on 7 May 1945 and surrendered to Allied forces the following day.

== Commanders ==
- Generalleutnant Friedrich Bayer (27 September 1942 – 11 October 1943);
- Generalleutnant Karl Böttcher (12 October – 7 December 1943);
- Generalleutnant Wolf Trierenberg (8 December 1943 – March 1945; April – May 1945);
- Generalleutnant Maximilian Siry (March 1945).

== Notes ==
Footnotes

Citations
