= Bambiderstroff =

- Commune
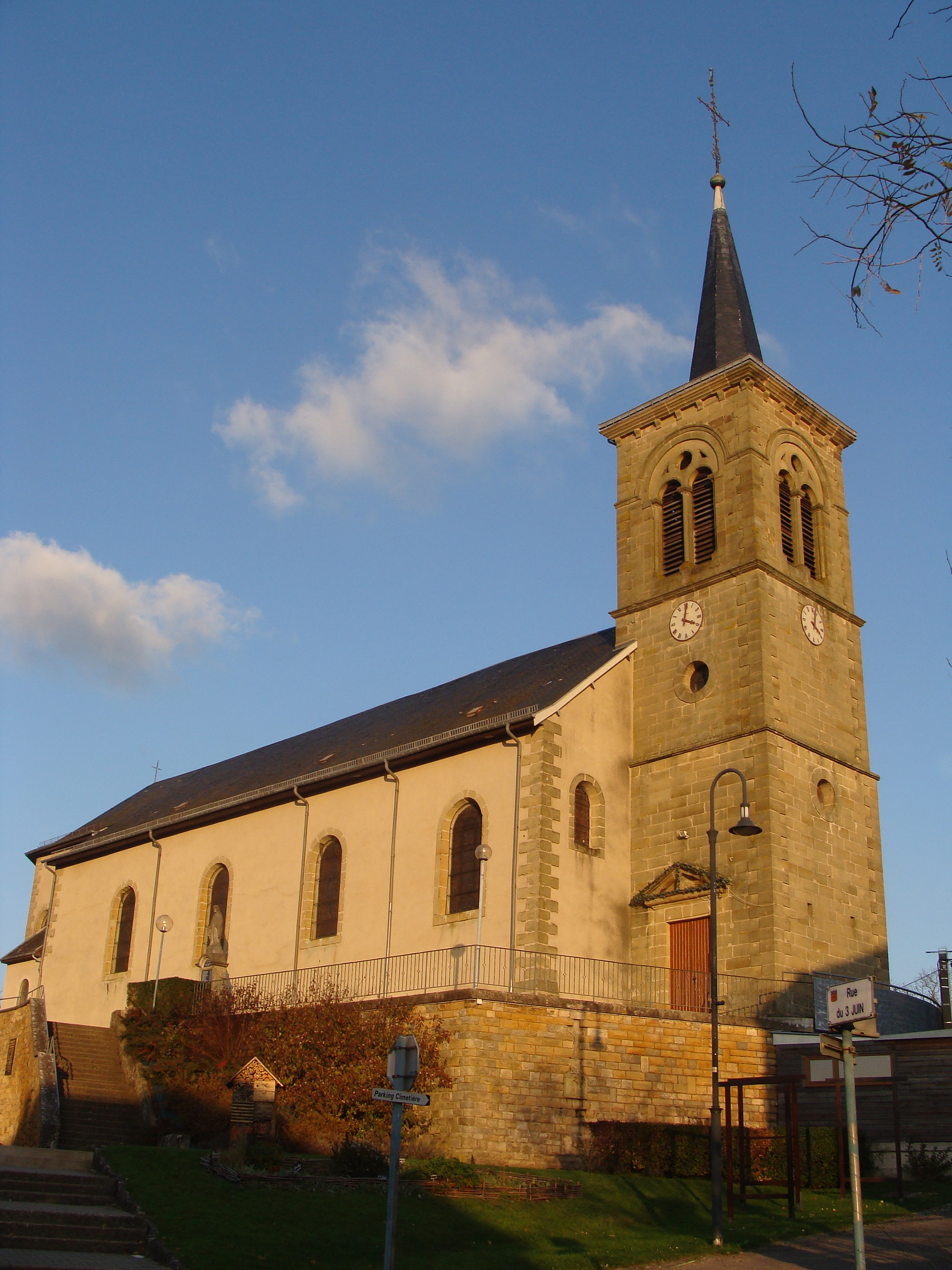
- The church in Bambiderstroff

- Coat of arms
- Location of Bambiderstroff
- Location within France Location within Grand Est
- Coordinates: 49°06′13″N 6°35′38″E
- Country: France
- Region: Grand Est
- Department: Moselle
- Arrondissement: Forbach-Boulay-Moselle
- Canton: Faulquemont
- Intercommunality: District urbain de Faulquemont

Government
  - Mayor (2020–2026): Christian Zwiebel
- Area^{1}: 11.05 km^{2} (4.27 sq mi)
- Elevation: 325 m (1,066 ft)
- Highest elevation: 405 m (1,329 ft)
- Lowest elevation: 269 m (883 ft)
- Population (2023): 1,016
  - Density: 91.95/km^{2} (238.1/sq mi)
- Time zone: UTC+01:00 (CET)
  - Summer (DST): UTC+02:00 (CEST)
- INSEE/Postal code: 57047 /57690
- ^{1} French Land Register data, which excludes lakes, ponds, glaciers > 1 km^{2} (0.386 sq mi or 247 acres) and river estuaries.

Bambiderstroff (French pronunciation: [bɑ̃bidɛʁstʁɔf]; German: Baumbiedersdorf) is a commune in the Moselle department in Grand Est in northeastern France.

== Population ==
Historical population
Year	Pop.	±% p.a.
1968	786	—
1975	808	+0.40%
1982	833	+0.44%
1990	885	+0.76%
1999	901	+0.20%
2007	1,012	+1.46%
2012	1,037	+0.49%
2017	1,060	+0.44%
2023	1,016	−0.70%
Source: INSEE

== See also ==
- Communes of the Moselle department
