= List of forts =

Overviews of forts

This is a list for articles on notable historical forts which may or may not be under current active use by a military. There are also many towns named after a Fort, the largest being Fort Worth, Texas, United States.

== Antigua and Barbuda ==
- Fort Barrington
- Fort Berkeley
- Fort Charlotte
- Fort James
- Shirley Heights

== Armenia ==
- Amberd
- Bjni Fortress
- Dashtadem Fortress
- Ertij Fort
- Halidzor Fortress
- Kakavaberd
- Kosh Fortress
- Lori Fortress
- Meghri Fortress
- Odzaberd
- Proshaberd
- Sardarapat Fortress
- Sev Berd
- Vorotnaberd

== Aruba ==
- Fort Zoutman
- Juwana Morto

== Australia ==
Sydney Harbour fortifications

- Beehive Casemate
- Bradleys Head Fortification Complex
- Fort Denison
- Fort Kirribilli
- Fort Macquarie
- Georges Head Battery
- Lower Georges Heights Commanding Position
- Middle Head Fortifications
- Steel Point Battery

Other fortifications

- Bare Island Fort
- Ben Buckler Gun Battery
- Breakwater Battery
- Drummond Battery
- Flagstaff Hill Fort
- Fort Banks
- Fort Glanville
- Fort Lytton
- Fort Nepean
- Fort Pearce
- Fort Philip
- Fort Queenscliff
- Fort Scratchley
- Henry Head Fort
- Illowra Battery
- Malabar Battery
- Old Rainworth Fort
- Signal Hill Battery
- Smiths Hill Fort
- South Channel Fort
- Swan Island Fort
- Wallace Battery

== Bahamas ==
- Fort Charlotte
- Fort Fincastle
- Fort Montagu
- Old Fort of Nassau

== Bahrain ==
- Arad Fort
- Riffa Fort
- Qalat Al Bahrain

== Bangladesh ==
- Hajiganj Fort
- Idrakpur Fort
- Jangalbari Fort
- Jinjira Palace (also used as a fort)
- Lalbagh Fort
- Mahasthangarh Fort
- Sonakanda Fort

== Barbados ==
- Saint Ann's Fort
- Charles Fort

== Belarus ==
- Babruysk fortress
- Brest fortress

== Belgium ==
=== Province of Antwerp ===
Antwerp

- Fort de Stabroeck
- Redoute de Capellen
- Fort de Brasschaet
- Fort de Schooten
- Fort de Lierre
- Forte de Wavre-Sainte-Catherine
- Fort de Breendonck
- Fort de Liezele
- Redoute de Puers
- Fort de Bornhem
- Fort de Steendorp

Antwerp (historical) (1914, internal defenses)

- Redoute d'Oorderen
- Fort de Zwyndrecht

=== Province of Liège ===
- Fort d'Aubin-Neufchâteau
- Fort de Barchon
- Fort de Battice
- Fort de la Chartreuse
- Citadelle of Liège
- Fort d'Eben-Emael
- Fort d'Évegnée
- Fort de Fléron
- Fort de Chaudfontaine
- Fort d'Embourg
- Fort de Boncelles
- Fort de Flémalle
- Fort de Hollogne
- Fort de Loncin
- Fort de Lantin
- Fort de Liers
- Fort de Pontise
- Fort de Tancrémont

=== Province of Namur ===
Namur (1914, clockwise from E, right bank of Meuse River)

- Fort de Maizeret
- Fort d'Andoy
- Fort de Dave
- Fort de Malonne
- Fort de Suarlée
- Fort de Cognelée
- Fort de Marchovelette

== Bermuda ==
Bermuda had around 90 coastal defense forts and batteries scattered all over the island chain. Early colonial defense works constructed before the 19th century were primarily small coastal batteries built of stone having anywhere from two to ten guns. Some of these early forts and batteries are the oldest standing masonry forts in the new world. Later forts constructed by the royal engineers were much larger and more complex.

- Fort St. Catherine
- The Martellos (Towers)/Ferry Reach
- King's Castle
- Fort Victoria, Bermuda

== Brazil ==
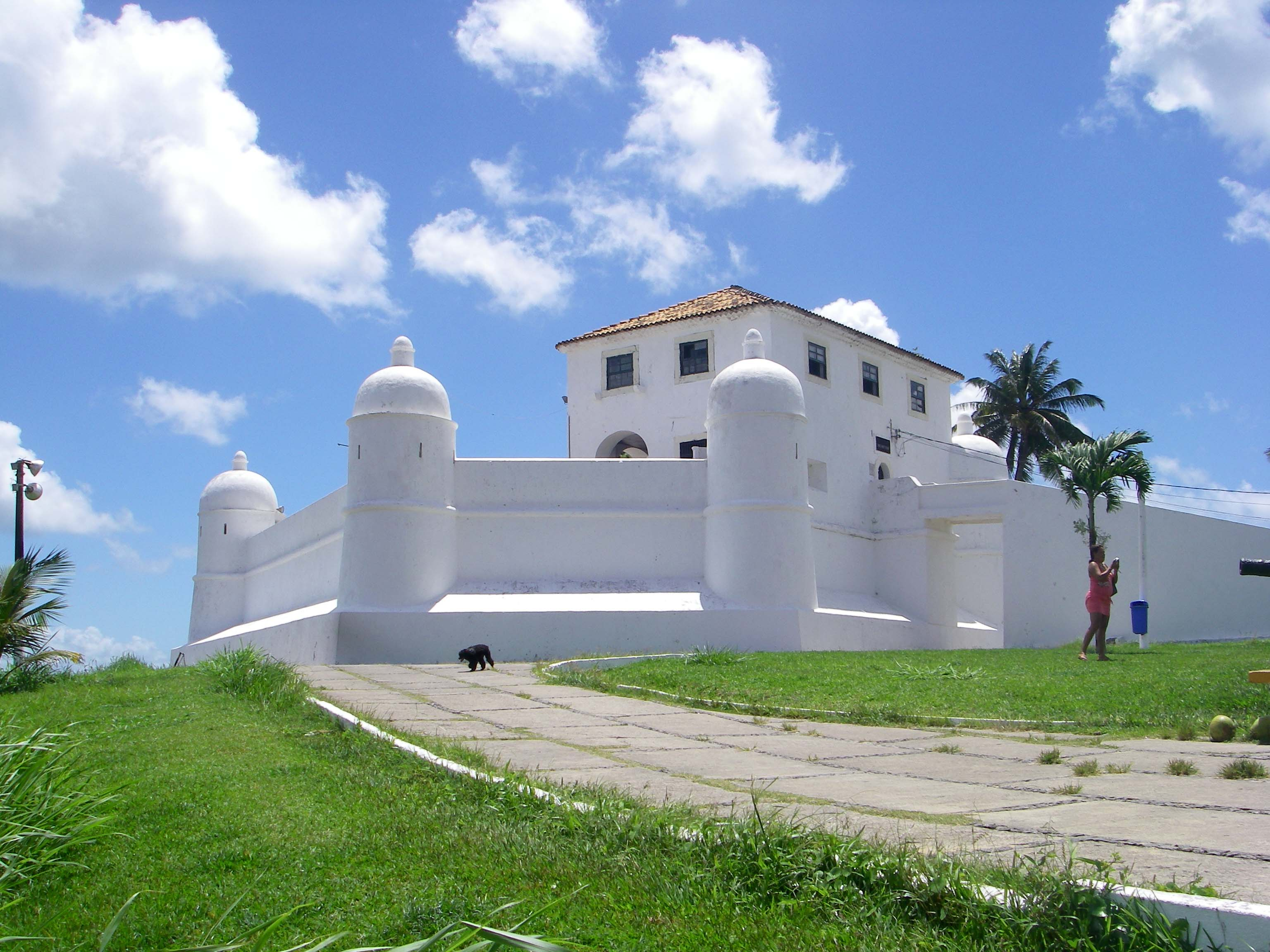
Fort of Monserrate in Salvador, Brazil

=== Amapá ===
- Fortaleza de São José de Macapá

=== Bahia ===
- Forte de Santa Maria
- Forte de Santo Antônio da Barra
- Forte de Santo Antônio Além do Carmo
- Forte de São Diogo
- Forte de São Lourenço
- São Marcelo Fort

=== Ceará ===
- Fortaleza de Nossa Senhora da Assunção

=== Pará ===
- Forte do Castelo de Belém

=== Paraná ===
- Fortaleza de Nossa Senhora dos Prazeres

=== Paraíba ===
- Forte de Santa Catarina

=== Pernambuco ===
- Forte de Nossa Senhora dos Remédios
- Fort Orange
- Forte de Santo Inácio de Tamandaré
- Forte de São João Batista do Brum
- Forte de São Tiago das Cinco Pontas

=== Rio de Janeiro ===
- Fort Copacabana
- Fortaleza de Nossa Senhora da Conceição
- Fortaleza de Santa Cruz da Barra
- Forte de São Domingos de Gragoatá
- Fortaleza de São João
- Forte de São Luís
- Forte de São Mateus do Cabo Frio

=== Rio Grande do Norte ===
- Forte dos Reis Magos

=== Santa Catarina ===
- Fortaleza de Santa Cruz de Anhatomirim
- Fortaleza de São José da Ponta Grossa

=== São Paulo ===
- Forte de São João da Bertioga

== Bulgaria ==
- Anevo Fortress, Sopot Municipality
- Asen's Fortress, Asenovgrad
- Baba Vida castle, Vidin
- Belogradchik fortress, Belogradchik
- Bozhenishki Urvich, near Botevgrad
- Castra Martis Roman fortress, Kula, Bulgaria
- Cherven fortress, Cherven, Ruse Province
- Hisarya fortress, Hisarya
- Kaliakra cape castle, Bulgarian Black Sea Coast
- Kovachevsko kale, Kovachevets
- Kyustendil fortress Hisarlaka
- Lyutitsa, Ivaylovgrad
- Markeli Roman fortress, Karnobat
- Oescus Roman fortress, Gigen
- Pliska capital city castle and fortress
- Plovdiv fortifications and walls - Eastern gate of Philippopolis, Hisar Kapia and Nebet Tepe
- Preslav capital city castle and fortress
- Nesebar town fortress
- Nicopolis ad Istrum Roman fortress and town, Nikyup, Veliko Tarnovo
- Nicopolis ad Nestum Roman fortress and town, Garmen, Gotse Delchev, Blagoevgrad Province
- Novae Roman fortress, Svishtov
- Rachovets fortress, Gorna Oryahovitsa
- Serdica fortress, Sofia
- Shumen fortress, Shumen
- Sostra, Lomets
- Storgosia, Pleven
- Trajan's Gate Roman fortress, near Sofia
- Trapezitsa fortress, Veliko Tarnovo
- Tsarevets fortress and castle, Veliko Tărnovo
- Tsepina, Dorkovo, near Velingrad, Western Rhodope Mountains
- Urvich castle, near Sofia
- Ustra, Eastern Rhodope Mountains

== Cuba ==
- Batería de la Reina
- La Cabaña
- Castillo de Atarés
- Castillo de San Pedro de la Roca
- Castillo San Salvador de la Punta
- Morro Castle

== Curaçao ==
- Beekenburg
- Fort Amsterdam
- Fort Nassau
- Piscadera Bay
- Rif Fort
- Waterfort

== Canada ==
Many buildings and structures bear the name fort in Canada. Most of these places are either military installations, or a trading post that was established by a North American fur trading company. A number of "forts" in northern and western Canada were also established as exploratory, or policing outposts.

A number of municipalities in Canada include the term fort in their names. The municipalities that use the term fort in their name do so for historical reasons, with many of these communities resulting from the outgrowth of migrants that settled around the original fort. Many of these municipalities continue to bear use the term fort in their names, regardless of whether or not the original fortification and/or trading post still stands.

=== Military fortifications ===
The majority of military fortifications in Canada were built by the British, French, and Canadian armed forces. However, several military fortifications were erected by the Hudson's Bay Company, whose royal charter required them to fortify Rupert's Land. Other groups that erected military fortifications in Canada includes First Nations, Spain, and the United States. Although military fortifications were built for strategic, and other military purposes, some military fortifications in Canada also housed trading posts, or was used by fur traders.

==== British Columbia ====
- Fort Rodd Hill
- Fort San Miguel
- Macaulay Point Battery
- Yorke Island
- Xudzedzalis

==== Manitoba ====
- Fort Rouge
- Prince of Wales Fort

==== New Brunswick ====
- Fort Beauséjour
- Fort Boishebert
- Carleton Martello Tower
- Fort Frederick
- Fort Nashwaak
- Fort Gaspareaux
- Fort Howe
- Fort Meductic
- Fort Menagoueche

==== Newfoundland and Labrador ====
- Fort Amherst
- Castle Hill
- Fort Carbonear
- Cuper's Cove Fort
- Fort Frederick
- Fort McAndrew
- Fort Pepperrell
- Fort Plaisance
- Fort Point
- Fort Royal
- Signal Hill Battery
- Fort Saint Louis
- Fort Townshend
- Fort Waldegrave
- Fort William

==== Nova Scotia ====
- Connaught Battery
- Cranberry Point Battery
- Devils Battery
- Fort Anne
- Fort Clarence
- Fort Edward
- Fort Ellis
- Fort Lawrence
- Fort Sackville
- Fort Sainte Anne
- Fort St. Louis, Guysborough County
- Fort St. Louis, Shelburne County
- Fort Vieux Logis
- Fort William Augustus
- Fortress of Louisbourg
- Georges Island
- Halifax Citadel
- Prince of Wales Tower
- York Redoubt

==== Ontario ====
- Bois Blanc Blockhouse
- Fort Amherstburg
- Fort Drummond
- Fort Erie
- Fort Frederick
- Fort Frontenac
- Fort George
- Fort Henry
- Fort Malden
- Fort Mississauga
- Fort Norfolk
- Fort St. Joseph
- Fort Wellington
- Fort York
- Gibraltar Point Blockhouse
- New Fort York
- Sherbourne Blockhouse

==== Prince Edward Island ====
- Fort Amherst

==== Quebec ====
- Citadel of Montreal
- Citadelle of Quebec
- Fort Blunder
- Fort Chambly
- Fort de l'Île Sainte-Hélène
- Fort Ingall
- Fort Laprairie
- Fort Lennox
- Fort Richelieu
- Fort Saint-Jean
- Fort Sainte Thérèse
- Fort Senneville
- Fort Trois-Rivières
- Fort Ville-Marie
- Lévis Forts

=== Exploratory forts ===
Several private entities, most notably the Hudson's Bay Company, established outposts or forts, within northern Canada for the purposes of housing exploratory expeditions to the Arctic. Forts that were built exclusively for the purposes of housing exploratory expeditions include:

- Fort Confidence, Northwest Territories
- Fort Conger, Nunavut
- Fort Reliance, Northwest Territories

=== Fur trading forts ===
A number of trading posts operated by fur trading companies were also referred to as forts. Fur trading companies that operated trading forts in Canada includes the Hudson's Bay Company, and the North West Company. Many of these were simply stockades, log enclosures for trading posts, although a few were former military installations which was later used by fur trading companies.

==== Alberta ====
- Fort Edmonton
- Fort Victoria
- Fort Whoop-Up

==== British Columbia ====
- Fort Defiance
- Fort Langley
- Fort Victoria
- Fort St. John

==== Manitoba ====
- Fort Bourbon
- Fort Dauphin
- Fort des Épinettes
- Fort Douglas
- Fort Ellice
- Fort Garry
- Fort Gibraltar
- Fort La Reine
- Fort Maurepas
- Fort Paskoya
- Lower Fort Garry
- York Factory

==== Northwest Territories ====
- Fort Collinson
- Old Fort Providence

==== Nunavut ====
- Fort Ross

==== Ontario ====
- Fort Douville
- Fort Kaministiquia
- Fort Matachewan
- Fort Rouillé
- Fort Saint Pierre
- Fort Toronto
- Fort William

==== Quebec ====
- Fort Saint Jacques
- Fort Témiscamingue

==== Saskatchewan ====
- Fort Carlton
- Fort de la Corne
- Fort de la Rivière Tremblante
- Fort Espérance
- Fort La Jonquière
- Fort Pitt
- Fort Sturgeon
- Pine Island Fort

==== Yukon ====
- Fort Reliance
- Fort Selkirk

=== Law enforcement forts ===
The North-West Mounted Police (later merged with the Dominion Police to form the Royal Canadian Mounted Police) established a number of policing outposts in western Canada during the mid to late 19th century, in an effort to provide law enforcement in the region. Forts established by the North-West Mounted Police includes:

- Fort Battleford, Saskatchewan
- Fort Calgary, Alberta
- Fort Livingstone, Saskatchewan
- Fort Walsh, Saskatchewan

== Channel Islands ==
Alderney

- Fort Clonque

Guernsey

- Bréhon Tower
- Fort Hommet
- Fort George, Guernsey
- Fort Grey
- Fort Saumarez

Jersey

- Fort Regent

== Chile ==
- Arauco
- Fort Bulnes
- Fort Chepe
- Chivicura
- Fort Colcura
- Espíritu Santo
- Fort de la Encarnación
- Huaca de Chena
- Jesus de Huenuraquí
- Fort Livén
- Fort Lonquén
- Nuestra de Señora de Halle
- Fort Reina Luisa
- Fort Paicavi
- Pucara del Cerro La Muralla
- Pukara de La Compañia
- Pukará de Quitor
- San Cristóbal de La Paz
- San Fabián de Conueo
- San Ignacio de la Redención
- San Jerónimo de Millapoa
- Fort San Pedro
- San Rafael de Coelemu
- Santa Bárbara
- Santa Cruz de Oñez
- Santa Fe de la Ribera
- Fort Santa Margarita
- Santísima Trinidad
- Santo Árbol de la Cruz
- Fort Talcahuano
- Fort Tolpán
- Valdivian Fort System
- Fort Virguenco

== China ==
=== Beijing ===
- Baimaguan Fort

=== Hong Kong ===
Chinese (Qing dynasty) forts

- Buddhist Hall (Tung Lung) Fort
- Fan Lau Fort
- Kowloon Walled City
- Tung Chung Fort
- Tung Chung Battery

British colonial forts

- Devil's Peak fortifications
- Lei Yue Mun Fort
- Murray Battery
- Pinewood Battery
- Stanley Fort

=== Macau ===
All forts in Macau were built during or used during Portuguese rule:

- Fortaleza da Guia
- Fortaleza de Mong Há
- Fortaleza do Monte

=== Tianjin ===
- Taku Forts, Tianjin

== Colombia ==
- Castillo San Felipe de Barajas (Muralla de Cartagena de Indias)

== Congo, Republic of the ==
- Fort de Shinkakasa

== Croatia ==
- Brod Fortress
- Dubrovnik
- Glavaš – Dinarić Fortress
- Knin Fortress
- Fort Lovrijenac
- Mirabella Fortress
- Monkodonja
- Fort Nečven
- Nehaj Fortress
- Nesactium
- Prevlaka Fortress
- Prozor Fortress
- Starigrad Fortress
- Tvrđa

== Cyprus ==
- Buffavento
- Kantara Castle
- Kyrenia Castle
- Saint Hilarion Castle

== Denmark ==
- Flakfortet
- Middelgrundsfortet
- Trekroner Fort

== Dominica ==
- Fort Cachacrou
- Fort Shirley
- Fort Young

== Dominican Republic ==
- Fortaleza Ozama
- Fortaleza San Felipe
- Fortaleza San Luis

== Estonia ==
- Toomemägi
- Toompea
- Valjala Stronghold
- Varbola Stronghold
- Fortifications of Peter the Great's Naval Fortress

- Aegna
- Kakumäe
- Naissaar
- Suurupi
- Viimsi

== Finland ==
- Turku Castle (sv: Åbo Slott)
- Häme Castle (sv: Tavastehus), Hämeenlinna
- Vyborg Castle, Viipuri (now in Russia)
- Olavinlinna (St. Olaf's Castle), Savonlinna
- Suomenlinna (sv: Sveaborg), Helsinki
- fortress city of Hamina,
- Svartholm fortress, Loviisa
- Ruotsinsalmi sea fortress (sv: Svensksund) and Kyminlinna
- Bomarsund Fortress, Sund, Åland
- Korela Fortress (fi: Käkisalmi, sv: Kexholm), Priozersk (Now in Russia)
- Lappeenranta (sv. Villmanstrand) Fortress
- Kärnäkoski Fortress, Savitaipale

== France ==
- Fort Bergues
- Fort Bayonne
- Fort de Bellegarde
- Bitche
- Fort Blaye
- Fort Bouillon
- Fort Boyard
- Fort Cambrai
- Fort Desaix
- Fort Douaumont
- Fort de Joux
- Fort Liberia (Villefranche-de-Conflent)
- Fort Louvois or Fort du Chapus
- Fort Montmédy
- Fort Le Quesnoy
- Fort Saint-Martin-de-Ré
- Fort de Vincennes
- Îles Saint-Marcouf

=== Séré de Rivières system ===
- Fort des Adelphes
- Fort des Ayvelles
- Fort des Basses Perches
- Fort de Bois-d'Arcy
- Fort de Bois l'Abbé
- Fort du Bois d'Oye
- Fort de Bourlémont
- Fort du Bruissin
- Fort de Champigny
- Fort de Châtillon (Paris)
- Fort de Condé-sur-Aisne
- Fort de Cormeilles-en-Parisis
- Fort de la Croix-de-Bretagne
- Fort de Domont
- Fort Douaumont
- Fort Dubois
- Fort de Giromagny
- Fort des Hautes Perches
- Fort de l'Infernet
- Fort de Leveau
- Fort de Liouville
- Fort de Maulde
- Fort du Mont Bart
- Fort de Montmorency
- Fort de l'Olive
- Fort de Plappeville
- Fort de la Pompelle
- Fort de Queuleu
- Fort du Replaton
- Fort de Roppe
- Fort du Salbert
- Fort de Saint-Cyr
- Fort de Sucy
- Fort du Télégraphe
- Fort de Tournoux
- Fort du Trou-d'Enfer
- Fort d'Uxegney
- Fort de Vancia
- Fort de Vaujours
- Fort Vaux
- Fort de Villey-le-Sec
- Fort de Villiers
- Fort de Viraysse
- Fort de Vézelois

=== Maginot Line (Northeast) ===
- Ouvrage Les Sarts
- Ouvrage de Bersillies
- Ouvrage La Salmagne
- Ouvrage de Boussois
- Ouvrage La Ferté
- Ouvrage Chesnois
- Ouvrage Thonnelle
- Ouvrage Vélosnes
- Ouvrage Ferme Chappy (PO)
- Ouvrage Fermont (GO)
- Ouvrage Latiremont (GO)
- Ouvrage Mauvais-Bois (PO)
- Ouvrage Bois-du-Four (PO)
- Ouvrage Bréhain(GO)
- Ouvrage Aumetz (PO)
- Ouvrage Rochonvillers (GO)
- Ouvrage Molvange (GO)
- Ouvrage Soetrich (GO)
- Ouvrage Kobenbusch (GO)
- Ouvrage Galgenberg (GO)
- Ouvrage Métrich (GO)
- Ouvrage Billig (GO)
- Ouvrage Immerhof (PO)
- Ouvrage Bois-Karre (PO)
- Ouvrage Oberheid (PO)
- Ouvrage Sentzich (PO)
- Ouvrage Hackenberg (GO)
- Ouvrage Mont des Welches (GO)
- Ouvrage Michelsberg (GO)
- Ouvrage Anzeling (GO)
- Ouvrage Coucou (PO)
- Ouvrage Hobling (PO)
- Ouvrage Bousse (PO)
- Ouvrage Berenbach (PO)
- Ouvrage Bovenberg (PO)
- Ouvrage Denting (PO)
- Ouvrage Village de Coume (PO)
- Ouvrage Annexe Nord de Coume (PO)
- Ouvrage Coume (PO)
- Ouvrage Annexe Sud de Coume (PO)
- Ouvrage Mottenberg (PO)
- Ouvrage Kerfent (PO)
- Ouvrage Bambesch (PO)
- Ouvrage Einseling (PO)
- Ouvrage Laudrefang (PO)
- Ouvrage Téting (PO)
- Ouvrage Haut-Poirier
- Ouvrage Simserhof
- Ouvrage Schiesseck
- Ouvrage Welschhof
- Ouvrage Rohrbach
- Ouvrage Otterbiel
- Ouvrage Grand-Hohékirkel
- Ouvrage Four-à-Chaux
- Ouvrage Lembach
- Ouvrage Hochwald
- Ouvrage Schoenenbourg

=== Alpine Line (Maginot Southeast) ===
- Ouvrage Chatelard (PO)
- Ouvrage Cave-à-Canon (PO)
- Ouvrage Sapey (GO)
- Ouvrage Saint-Gobain (GO)
- Ouvrage Saint-Antoine (GO)
- Ouvrage Le Lavoir (GO)
- Ouvrage Pas du Roc (GO)
- Ouvrage Arrondaz (PO)
- Ouvrage Les Rochilles (PO)
- Ouvrage Janus (GO)
- Ouvrage Col de la Buffère (PO)
- Ouvrage Col du Granon (PO)
- Ouvrage Les Aittes (PO)
- Ouvrage Gondran (PO)
- Ouvrage Roche-la-Croix (GO)
- Ouvrage Saint Ours Haut (GO)
- Ouvrage Plate Lombard (PO)
- Ouvrage Fontvive Nord-ouest (PO)
- Ouvrage Saint Ours Nord-est (PO)
- Ouvrage Saint Ours Bas (PO)
- Ouvrage Ancien Camp (PO)
- Ouvrage Restefond (GO)
- Ouvrage Col de Restefond (PO)
- Ouvrage Granges Communes (PO)
- Ouvrage La Moutière (PO)
- Ouvrage Col de Crous (PO)
- Ouvrage Rimplas (GO)
- Ouvrage Fressinéa (PO)
- Ouvrage Valdeblore (PO)
- Ouvrage Col du Caire Gros (PO)
- Ouvrage Col du Fort(PO)
- Ouvrage Gordolon (GO)
- Ouvrage Flaut (GO)
- Ouvrage Baisse de Saint-Véran (PO)
- Ouvrage Plan Caval (PO)
- Ouvrage La Béole (PO)
- Ouvrage Col d'Agnon (PO)
- Ouvrage La Déa (PO)
- Ouvrage Col de Brouis (GO)
- Ouvrage Monte Grosso (GO)
- Ouvrage Champ de Tir (PO)
- Ouvrage L'Agaisen (GO)
- Ouvrage Saint-Roch (GO)
- Ouvrage Barbonnet (GO)
- Ouvrage Castillon (GO)
- Ouvrage Col des Banquettes (PO)
- Ouvrage Sainte-Agnès (GO)
- Ouvrage Col de Garde (PO)
- Ouvrage Mont Agel (GO)
- Ouvrage Roquebrune (GO)
- Ouvrage Croupe du Reservoir (PO)
- Ouvrage Cap Martin (GO)

=== Former German fortifications ===
- Fort de Mutzig

=== Moselstellung ===
- Fort d'Illange
- Fort de Guentrange
- Fort de Koenigsmacker
- Fort Jeanne d'Arc

=== Overseas France ===
- Fort Cépérou (French Guiana)
- Fort Delgrès (Guadeloupe)
- Fort Fleur d'épée (Guadeloupe)
- Fort Diamant (French Guiana)
- Fort Gustav (Saint Barthélemy)
- Fort Karl (Saint Barthélemy)
- Fort Louis (Saint Martin)
- Fort Napoléon des Saintes (Guadeloupe)
- Fort Oscar (Saint Barthélemy)
- Fort Saint Louis (Martinique)
- Pointe aux Cannon Battery (Saint Pierre Island)

== Germany ==
- Ayers Kaserne
- Wildenstein Castle (Leibertingen)
- Ehrenbreitstein Fortress
- Grauerort fortress
- Königstein Fortress
- Moritzburg Fortress
- Petersberg Citadel
- Saalburg
- Spandau Citadel
- Fortress of Ulm
- Veste Coburg
- Veste Oberhaus
- Mainz Citadel

== Grenada ==
- Fort George

== Haiti ==
- Citadelle Laferrière
- Fort la Bouque
- Fort Dimanche
- Fort-Liberté
- Fort Rivière
- Fort de Rocher

== India ==
Kangra Fort, Himachal Pradesh
- Red Fort, Delhi
- Amer Fort, Rajasthan
- Agra Fort, Uttar Pradesh
- Jaisalmer Fort, Rajasthan
- Daulatabad fort, Maharashtra
- Golkonda Fort, Telangana
- Junagarh Fort, Bikaner, Rajasthan
- Gwalior Fort, Madhya Pradesh
- Raisen Fort, Madhya pradesh
- Jhansi Fort, Uttar Pradesh
- Chittorgarh Fort, Chittorgarh, Rajasthan
- Mehrangarh Fort, Rajasthan
- Diu Fort, Daman and Diu
- Chapora Fort, Goa
- Pratapgad, Maharashtra
- Palakkad Fort, Kerala
- Jaigarh Fort, Rajasthan
- Kumbhalgarh, Rajasthan
- Raigad Fort, Maharashtra
- Ranthambore Fort, Rajasthan
- Bellary Fort, Karnataka
- Yadgir Fort, Karnataka
- Bekal Fort, Kerala
- Purana Qila, Delhi
- Warangal Fort, Andhra Pradesh
- Nahargarh Fort, Rajasthan
- Taragarh Fort, Rajasthan
- Bhangarh Fort, Rajasthan
- Fort Aguada, Goa

Himachal Pradesh

- Kangra Fort, Kangra

== Indonesia ==
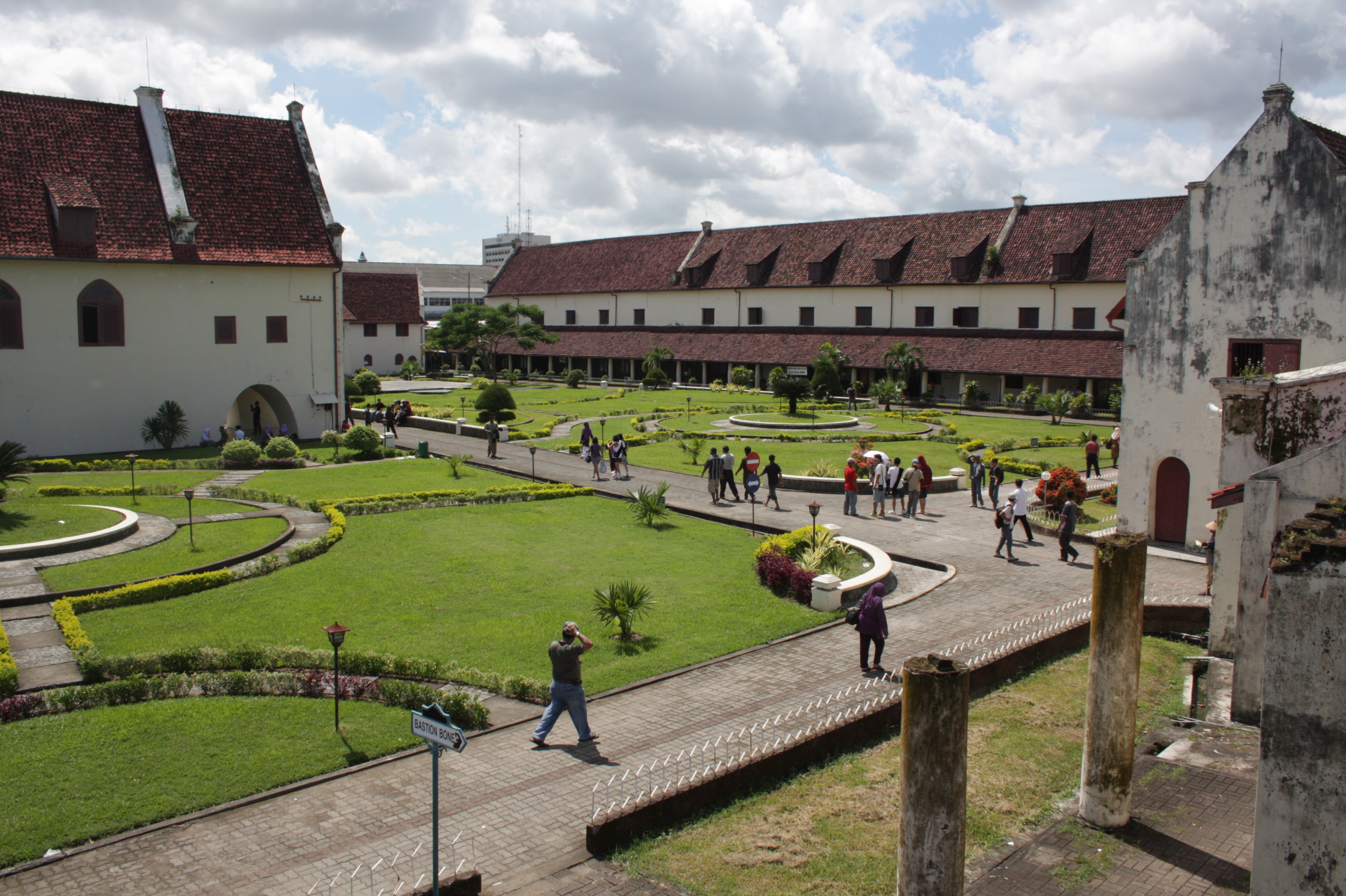
Fort Rotterdam, built in Makassar by the Dutch in 1634

=== Java ===
- Batavia Castle (demolished)
- Citadel Prins Frederik (demolished, now Istiqlal Mosque, Jakarta)
- Kotagede's Cepuri
- Fort Portuguese
- Fort van den Bosch
- Fort van der Wijck
- Fort Vastenburg
- Fort Vredeburg
- Fort Willem I
- Fort Willem II
- Waterkasteel, Batavia (demolished)
- Fort Pendem

=== The Moluccas ===
- Fort Amsterdam, Ambon
- Fort Belgica
- Fort Kalamata
- Fort Nassau
- Fort Oranje, Ternate
- Fort Tolukko
- Fort Kastela
- Fort Duurstede
- Fort Tahula

=== Papua ===
- Fort Du Bus (demolished)

=== Sulawesi ===
- Otanaha Fortress
- Fort Rotterdam
- Buton Palace Fortress
- Fort Somba Opu

=== Sumatra ===
- Fort Inong Balee
- Fort de Kock
- Fort Marlborough
- Fort van der Capellen

== Iran ==
- Agha Khan Liravi-ye Castle
- Alamut Castle
- Ammameh Castle
- Ardalan Castle
- Ardeshir Castle
- Arg-e Bam
- Arg of Tabriz
- Atashgah Castle
- Babak Fort
- Bakhtak Leylan Castle
- Chaleshtar Castle
- Chanef Castle
- Ernan Castle
- Espakeh Castle
- Fort of Our Lady of the Conception
- Gabri Castle, Ray
- Geli Castle
- Gouged Stronghold
- Iraj Castle
- Izad-Khast Castle
- Junqan Castle
- Jushin Castle
- Kalat Ahram Castle
- Kangelo Castle
- Karshahi Castle
- Keshit Castle
- Kordasht Castle
- Lambsar Castle
- Leshtan Castle
- Lisar Castle
- Machi Castle
- Mansur Kuh Castle
- Manujan Castle
- Mozaffarabad Castle
- Naryn Castle, Meybod
- Palace of Ardashir
- Poshtab Castle
- Qahqah Castle
- Qal'eh Dokhtar
- Rashkan Castle
- Rayen Castle
- Rey Castle
- Robat Castle
- Rudkhan Castle
- Sa'dabad Complex
- Sang Castle
- Sarvestan Palace
- Semiran Castle
- Shapur Khast
- Shavvaz Castle
- Shush Castle
- Zahhak Castle
- Ziaratgah Castle

== Israel ==
- Acre
- Arsuf (a.k.a. Apollonia)
- Belveer
- Belvoir (a.k.a. Kochav Ha-Yarden
- Beth Gibelin
- Besan
- Burj al Ahmar, (a.k.a. khirbet Burgata)
- Bokek Stronghold
- Binar Bashi (a.k.a. Antipatris Fortress)
- Caesarea
- Cafarlet (a.k.a. HaBonim Fortress)
- Casal des Plains
- Castellum Regis
- Château Pèlerin (a.k.a. Atlit Fortress etlit)
- Latrun
- Le Destroit
- Kal'at Al Mina (a.k.a. Ashdod-Yam Fortress)
- Masada (Metzada in Hebrew)
- Mirabel (a.k.a. Migdal Afek or Migdal Tsedek or majdal yaba in Arabic)
- Montfort Castle
- Nimrod Fortress (a.k.a. Qal'at Namrud)
- Qaqun Fortress
- Tower of David
- Sepphoris
- Vadum Iacob (a.k.a. Ateret Fortress)
- Yehiam Fortress

== Italy ==
=== Abruzzo ===
- Forte Spagnolo, L'Aquila

=== Aosta Valley ===
- Fort Bard, Bard

=== Apulia ===
- Forte a Mare, Brindisi

=== Liguria ===
- Walls of Genoa
- Priamar Fortress, Savona

=== Marche ===
- Fortress of San Leo, Marche

=== Piedmont ===
- Fenestrelle Fort, Piedmont

=== Tuscany ===
- Belvedere, Florence

== Jamaica ==
- Fort Charles
- Fort George
- Rockfort

== Japan ==
- Goryōkaku, Hakodate, Hokkaidō
- Hekirichi Bastion Fort, Hokuto, Hokkaidō
- Shiryokaku, Hakodate, Hokkaidō
- Katsuragaoka Chashi, Abashiri, Hokkaidō
- Obama Domain Battery Sites, Obama, Fukui
- Tatsuoka Castle, Saku, Nagano

== Kenya ==
- Fort Jesus

== Kosovo ==
- Dardana Fortress
- Duboc Fortress
- Harilaq Fortress
- Kasterc Fortress
- Korisha Fortress
- Llanishta Fortress
- Novo Brdo Fortress
- Pogragja Fortress
- Prilepac
- Prizren Fortress
- Vuçak Fortress
- Vushtrri Castle
- Zatriq
- Zvečan Fortress

== Libya ==
- Fort Capuzzo
- Fortress of Ghat

== Lithuania ==
- Apuolė
- Aukštupėnai mound
- Karmazinai mound
- Kernavė
- Molavėnai
- Napoleon's Hill
- Pilėnai
- Ukmergė
- Voruta

Kaunas Fortress fortifications (listed in order of number)

- Seventh Fort
- Ninth Fort

== Malaysia ==
- Fort Cornwallis
- Porta de Santiago or Fort A'Famosa
- Fort Margherita
- Fort Sylvia
- Kota Lukut
- Kota Belanda or Kota Dindingh
- Kota Ngah Ibrahim

== Malta ==
- Fort Benghisa
- Fort Binġemma
- Fort Cambridge
- Fort Campbell
- Fort Chambray
- Fort Delimara
- Fort Leonardo
- Fort Madalena
- Fort Manoel
- Fort Mosta
- Fort Pembroke
- Fort Ricasoli
- Fort Rinella
- Fort Saint Angelo
- Fort Saint Elmo
- Fort San Lucian
- Fort Saint Michael
- Fort Saint Rocco
- Fort San Salvatore
- Fort Spinola
- Fort Tas-Silġ
- Fort Tigné
- Fort Verdala

== Netherlands ==
- Fort Nassau
- Fort Bourtange

=== Forts on the Dutch Waterline ===
- Fort Pampus
- Fort de Roovere
- Wierickerschans
- Fort Pannerden

=== Forts on the Stelling van Amsterdam ===
- Fort along Den Ham
- Fort near De Kwakel
- Muiden Fortress
- Fort Vijfhuizen
- Vuurtoreneiland

=== Forts in the Caribbean Netherlands ===
- Fort Orange (Bonaire)
- Fort Oranje (St. Eustatius)
- Waterfort (St. Eustatius)

== New Zealand ==
- Fort Ballance
- Fort Buckley
- Fort Jervois
- Gate Pa
- Harington Point
- North Head, New Zealand
- Ruapekapeka
- Stony Batter
- Wrights Hill Fortress

== Oman ==
- Al Jalali Fort
- Al-Mirani Fort
- Bahla Fort
- Nakhal Fort
- Nizwa Fort

== Pakistan ==
- Lahore Fort, Lahore city
- Rohtas Fort, Jhelum
- Altit Fort, Hunza Valley
- Baltit Fort, Karimabad
- Khaplu Fort, Khaplu
- Ranikot Fort, Jamshoro
- Rawat Fort, Islamabad
- Faiz Mahal, Khairpur
- Umerkot Fort, Umerkot

== Panama ==
- Fort Amador
- Fort Davis
- Fort De Lesseps
- Fort Kobbe
- Fort Randolph (Panama)
- Fort San Lorenzo
- Fort Sherman
- Portobelo

== Peru ==
- Acaray
- Chanquillo
- Fort of Santa Catalina
- Real Felipe Fortress
- Saksaywaman

== Philippines ==
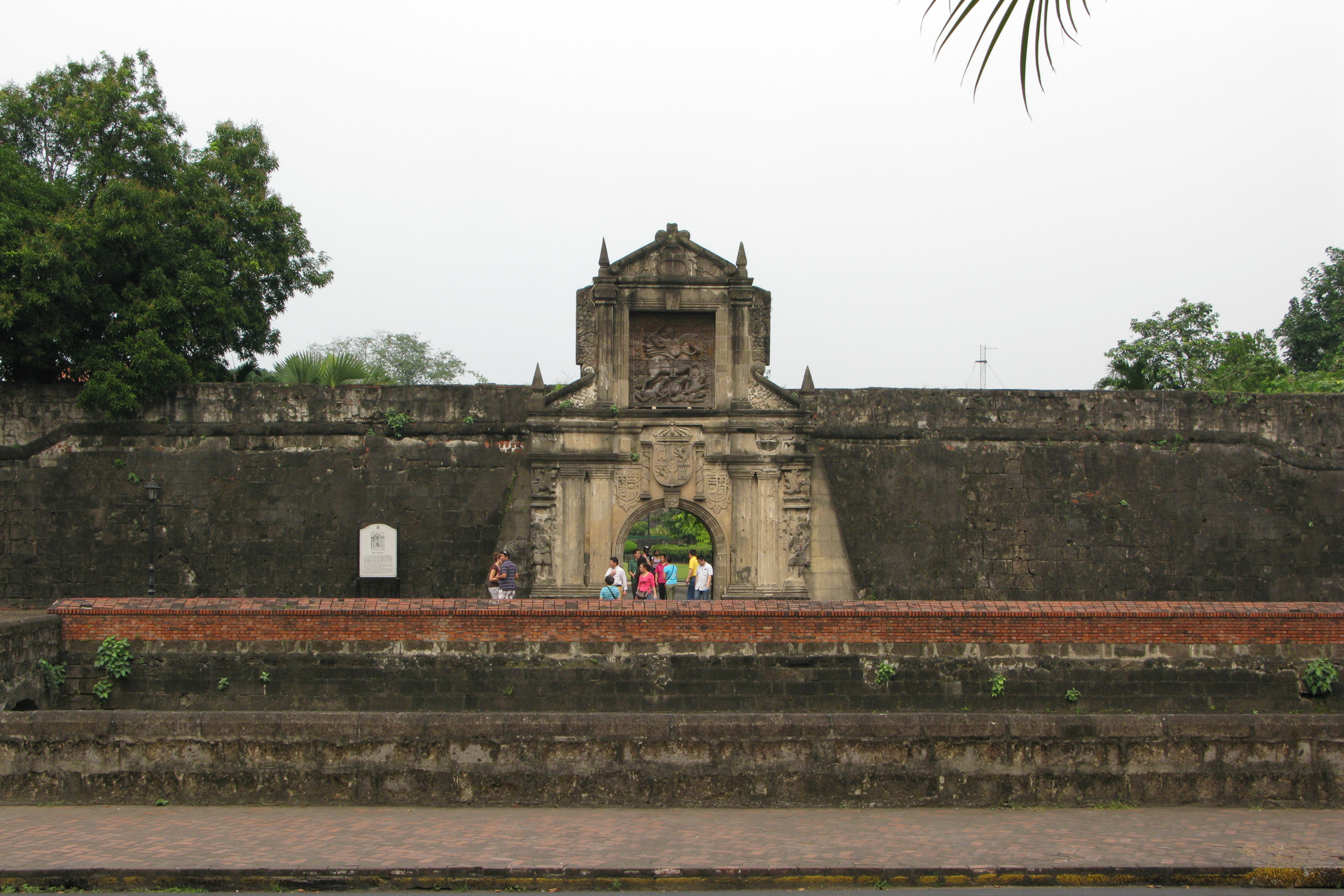
Fort Santiago, built in Manila by the Spanish in 1571

- Fort Cuyo, Cuyo Island, Palawan
- Fort Bonifacio, Taguig City
- Fort Del Pilar, Baguio City
- Fort Drum (Philippines), El Fraile Island
- Fort Hughes, Caballo Island
- Fort Frank, Carabao Island
- Fort Magsaysay, Nueva Ecija
- Fort Mills, Corregidor Island
- Fort of the Conception and of the Triumph, Ozamiz City, Misamis Occidental
- Fort Pilar, Zamboanga City
- Fort San Pedro, Cebu City
- Fort San Pedro, Iloilo City
- Fort San Felipe, Cavite City
- Fort Santa Isabel, Taytay, Palawan
- Fort Santiago, Intramuros, Manila
- San Diego de Alcala Fortress, Gumaca, Quezon
- Cuartel de Santo Domingo, Santa Rosa City, Laguna
- Fort Wint, Grande Island, Subic Bay
- Idjang, Batanes

== Poland ==
- Kłodzko Fortress
- Kraków Fortress
- Międzyrzecz Fortification Region
- Modlin Fortress
- Osowiec
- Poznań Fortress
- Toruń Fortress
- Warsaw Fortress

== Portugal ==
- Belém Tower, Lisbon
- Citadel of Cascais
- Fort of Aguieira
- Forts of Ajuda
- Fort of Alqueidão
- Fort of Arpim, Bucelas, Loures
- Fort of Arrifana
- Fort of Carvalha
- Fort of Casa
- Fort of Cego
- Fort of Consolation Beach
- Fort of Cresmina
- Fort of Feira, Malveira, Mafra
- Fort of Feiteira
- Fort of Giribita, Oeiras
- Fort of Greta, Horta
- Fort of Guincho, Cascais
- Fort of Leça da Palmeira, Porto
- Fort of Milreu, Ericeira
- Fort of Mosqueiro
- Fort of Negrito, Angra do Heroísmo
- Fort of Olheiros
- Castelo da Póvoa, Póvoa de Varzim
- Fort of Nossa Senhora da Encarnação, Lagoa
- Fort of Nossa Senhora da Guia (Cascais)
- Fort of Nossa Senhora das Mercês de Catalazete, Oeiras
- Fort of Nossa Senhora da Rocha, Lagoa
- Fort of Paimogo
- Fort of Pessegueiro Island, Sines
- Fort of Ponta da Bandeira, Lagos, Portugal
- Fort of Ribas
- Fort of Santa Catarina, Portimão
- Fort of Santo António de Belixe, Sagres
- Fort of Santo Amaro do Areeiro, Oeiras
- Fort of São Bruno, Oeiras, Lisbon District
- Fort of São João Baptista, Berlengas, Peniche
- Fort of São João do Arade, Lagoa
- Fort of São Jorge at Oitavos
- Fort of São Julião da Barra, Oeiras, Lisbon District
- Fort of São João Baptista, Angra do Heroísmo
- Fort of São Pedro do Estoril, Cascais
- Fort of São Sebastião de Caparica, Almada
- Fort of São Tiago, Funchal, Madeira
- Fort of São Teodósio da Cadaveira, Estoril
- Fort of São Vicente, Torres Vedras
- Forts of Serra da Aguieira
- Fort of Subserra
- Fort of Zambujal, Mafra
- Peniche Fortress
- Valença Fortress, Valença

== Russia ==
- Alexandrov Kremlin
- Astrakhan Kremlin
- Fort Alexander (St. Petersburg)
- Gdov Kremlin
- Ivangorod fortress
- Kazan Kremlin
- Kolomna Kremlin
- Kronstadt
- Moscow Kremlin
- Nizhny Novgorod Kremlin
- Novgorod Kremlin
- Peter and Paul Fortress, Saint Petersburg
- Por-Bazhyn, Tuva Republic
- Tobolsk Kremlin
- Tula Kremlin
- Vladivostok Fortress
- Novokuznetsk Fortress
- Oreshek Fortress
- Koporie
- Yam
- Ivangorod

== Saint Kitts and Nevis ==
- Brimstone Hill Fortress (Saint Kitts)
- Fort Charles (Nevis)
- Fort Charles (Saint Kitts)

== Saint Vincent and the Grenadines ==
- Fort Charlotte

== Saudi Arabia ==
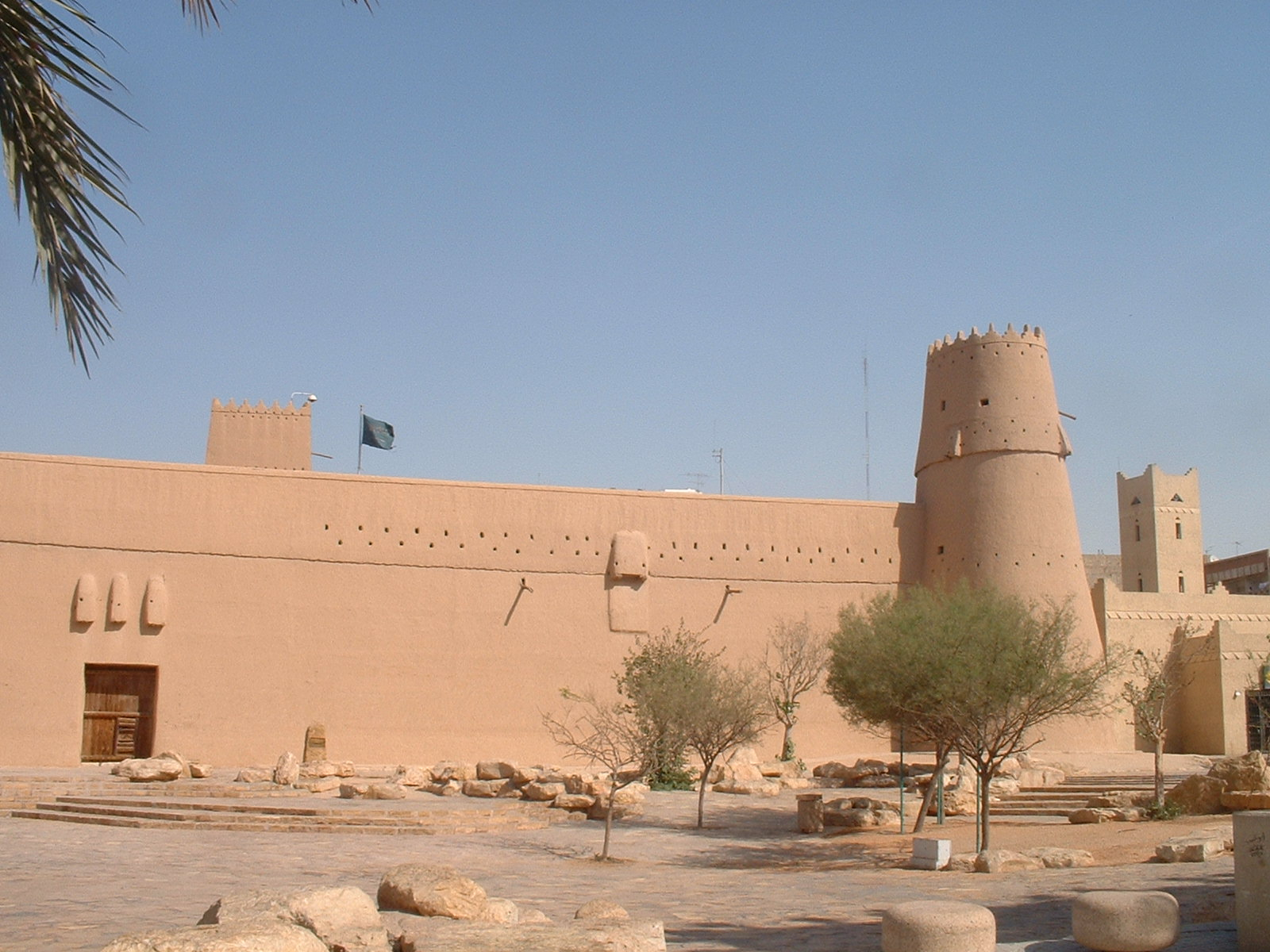
Masmak Fortress in Riyadh, Saudi Arabia

- Maskmak Fortress

== Singapore ==
- Fort Canning
- Fort Pasir Panjang
- Fort Siloso
- Fort Tanjong Katong

== Sint Maarten ==
- Fort Amsterdam
- Fort Willem I
- St. Peter's Battery
- Old Spanish Fort
- Fort Belair

== South Africa ==
- Fort Amiel, KwaZulu-Natal
- Fort Beaufort, Eastern Cape
- Fort Cox, Eastern Cape
- Fort de Goede Hoop, Western Cape
- Fort Merensky, Mpumalanga
- Johannesburg Fort, Gauteng
- Fort Klapperkop, Gauteng
- Fort Schanskop, Gauteng
- Fort Wonderboompoort, Gauteng
- Redoubt Duijnhoop, Western Cape

== South Korea ==
- Hwaseong Fortress, Suwon

== Spain ==
=== A Coruña ===
- Muralla de Santiago de Compostela

=== Albacete ===
- Fort Chinchilla

=== Badajoz ===
- Fort Jerez de los Caballeros

=== Burgos ===
- Fort Cartagena

=== Cádiz ===
- Batería de Aspiroz
- Muelle de Gallineras
- Fuerte de Punta Carnero
- Fuerte de San García
- Batería de San Genís
- Fort San Marcos
- Batería de San Melitón de la Calavera
- Fort Sancti Petri (San Fernando)
- Batería de Urrutia

=== Province of Castellón ===
- Fort Peníscola

=== Córdoba ===
- Fort Molina de Aragón

=== Coria, Cáceres ===
- Fort Coria

=== Girona ===
- Fort Sant Ferran (Figueres)

=== Huelva ===
- Fort Cartaya
- Fort Niebla
- Fort Cortegana

=== Málaga ===
- Muralla urbana de Marbella

=== Menorca ===
- Fort San Felipe

=== Murcia ===
- Fort Caravaca de la Cruz

=== Navarre ===
- Fort Olite
- Fort San Cristóbal

=== Palma de Mallorca ===
- Fort Bellver

=== Segovia ===
- Alcázar of Segovia

=== Soria ===
- Fort Berlanga de Duero

=== Toledo ===
- Fort Toledo

=== Valladolid ===
- Fort Encinas de Esgueva
- Fort Peñafiel
- Fort Simancas
- Fort Villalba de los Alcores

=== Zaragoza ===
- Aljaferia

== Sudan ==
- Buhen

== Sweden ==
- Bodens fästning
- Carlsten
- Bohus Fästning
- Karlsborg Fortress

== Taiwan (Republic of China) ==
- Cihou Fort
- Eternal Golden Castle
- Fort Provintia
- Fort Santo Domingo
- Fort Zeelandia
- Huwei Fort
- Uhrshawan Battery

== Turkey ==
- Anadoluhisarı
- Dardanelles Fortified Area Command
- Diyarbakır Fortress
- Rumelihisarı
- Şeytan Castle
- Trapessac
- Walls of Constantinople
- Yedikule Fortress

== Ukraine ==
- Bohorodytska Fortress
- Dubno Castle
- Kyiv fortress
- Kodak Fortress
- Letychiv Fortress
- Lutsk Castle
- Lysa Hora
- Medzhybizh Fortress
- Okopy Świętej Trójcy
- Ostroh Castle
- Sevastopol
- Zaporizhian Sich
- Fortress of St. Elizabeth

== United Arab Emirates ==
- Al Baithnah Fort
- Al Fahidi Fort
- Al Mahatta Fort
- Al Jahili Fort
- Fujairah Fort
- Qasr al-Hosn
- Sakamkam Fort
- Sharjah Fort

== United Kingdom ==
See also the list of castles, as many early forts were called castles, and many castle sites were reused for later fortifications. Also Palmerston Forts lists the many British fortifications built in the 1860s.

=== England ===
==== SE England ====
- Dymchurch Redoubt
- Eastbourne Redoubt
- Fort Burgoyne
- Admiralty Pier Turret
- Dover Western Heights
- Littlehampton Fort
- Newhaven Fort
- Saxon Shore forts
- Shoreham Redoubt

==== Thames Estuary ====
- Coalhouse Fort
- Cliffe Fort
- Maunsell Sea Forts
- New Tavern Fort
- Shornmead Fort
- Slough Fort
- Tilbury Fort

==== Medway ====
- Fort Horsted
- Fort Amherst
- Fort Borstal
- Fort Bridgewood
- Fort Clarence
- Fort Darnet
- Fort Luton
- Fort Hoo
- Fort Pitt
- Garrison Point Fort
- Grain Fort & Grain Tower Battery

==== Solent ====
Portsdown Hill

- Crookhorn Redoubt
- Fort Fareham
- Farlington Redoubt
- Fort Nelson
- Fort Southwick
- Fort Purbrook
- Fort Wallington
- Fort Widley

Gosport

- Fort Blockhouse
- Fort Brockhurst
- Fort Elson
- Fort Gilkicker
- Fort Grange
- Fort Monckton
- Fort Rowner

Portsmouth

- Fort Cumberland
- Lumps Fort

Sea Forts

- Horse Sand Fort
- No Man's Land Fort
- Spitbank Fort
- St Helens Fort

Isle of Wight

==== SW England ====
- Bideford
  - Chudleigh Fort
- Berry Head
- Bristol Channel
  - Brean Down Fort
- Dartmouth
  - Bayard's Cove Fort
- Plymouth
  - Royal Citadel
  - Agaton Fort
  - Breakwater Fort
  - Cawsand Fort
  - Crownhill Fort
  - Ernesettle Fort
  - Fort Bovisand
  - Picklecombe Fort
  - Polhawn Fort
  - Fort Scraesdon
  - Fort Tregantle
  - Whitesand Bay Battery
  - Woodlands Fort
- Isle of Portland
  - Verne Citadel
  - East Weare Battery
  - High Angle Battery
  - Blacknor Fort
- Weymouth
  - Nothe Fort

==== East Anglia ====
- Bath Side Battery
- Beacon Hill Battery
- Harwich Redoubt
- Landguard Fort
- Shotley Battery

==== NW England ====
- Liscard Battery
- Fort Perch Rock
- Jonathan Fort

==== NE England ====
- The Humber Forts
- Fort Paull
- The Tyne Turrets

=== Scotland ===
- Fort Charlotte, Shetland
- Fort George, Scotland

=== Wales ===
Milford Haven

- Dale Fort
- Fort Hubberstone
- Popton Fort
- Pill Fort
- Chapel Bay Fort
- South Hook Fort
- Fort Scoveston
- Stack Rock Fort
- Thorn Island Fort
- St Catherine's Fort
- Fort Belan

== United States ==
=== Alabama ===
- Fort Armstrong
- Fort Bainbridge
- Fort Bibb
- Fort Bowyer
- Fort Carney
- Fort Charlotte
- Fort Claiborne
- Fort Crawford
- Fort Dale
- Fort Decatur
- Fort Easley
- Fort Gaines
- Fort Glass
- Fort Hampton
- Fort Harker
- Fort Hull
- Fort Jackson
- Fort Landrum
- Fort Leslie
- Fort Likens
- Fort Louis de la Mobile
- Fort Madison
- Fort McClellan
- Fort Mims
- Fort Mitchell
- Fort Morgan
- Fort Novosel
- Fort Sinquefield
- Fort Stoddert
- Fort Strother
- Fort Williams

=== Alaska ===
- Fort Abercrombie
- Fort Davis
- Fort Egbert
- Fort Gibbon
- Fort Greely
- Fort Liscum
- Fort McGilvray
- Fort Randall Army Airfield
- Fort Raymond (Alaska)
- Fort Richardson
- Fort Rousseau
- Fort St. Michael
- Fort Schwatka
- Fort Wainwright
- Fort William H. Seward
- Fort Yukon

=== Arizona ===
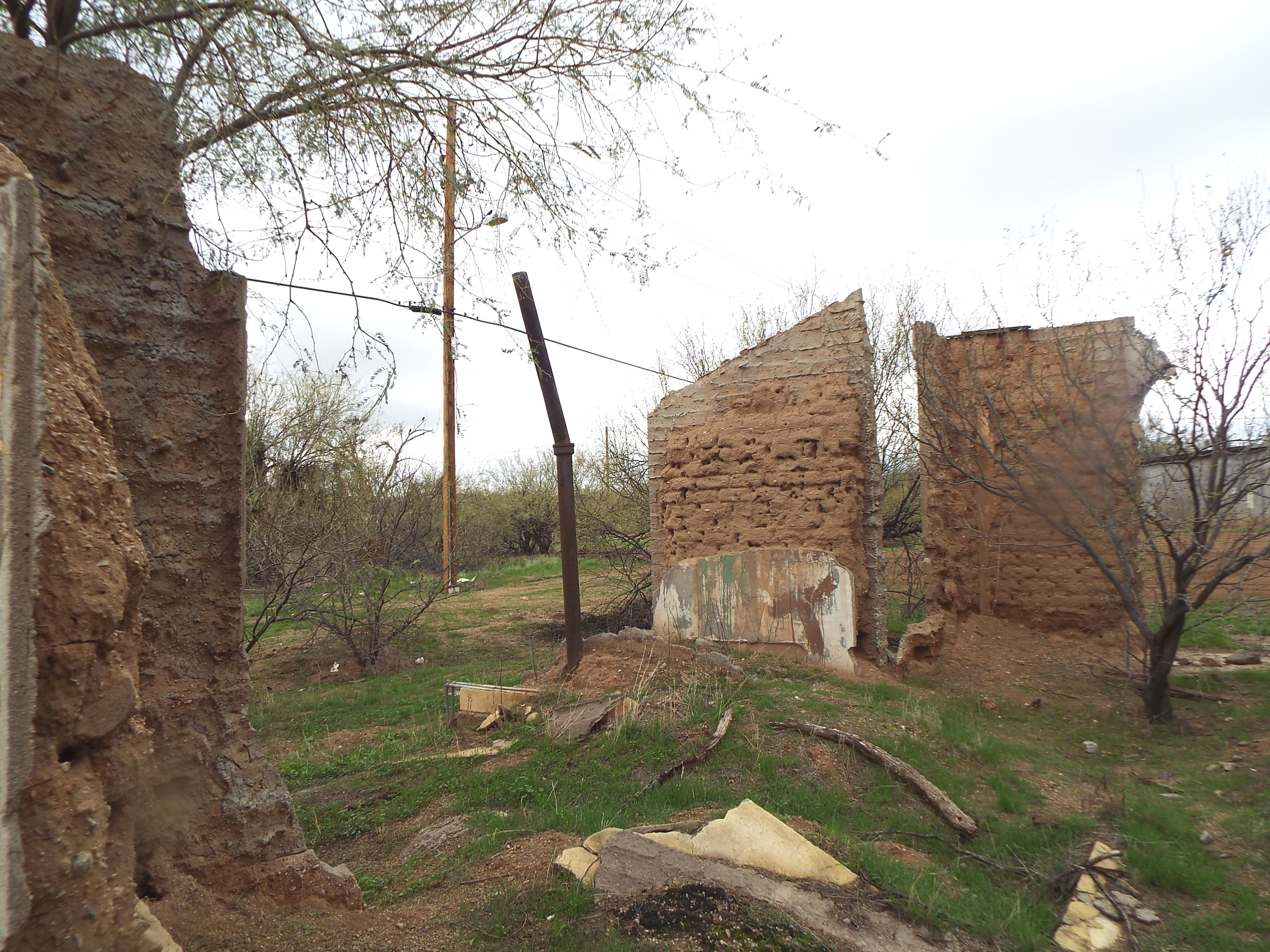
The ruins of the Fort McDowell officers quarters

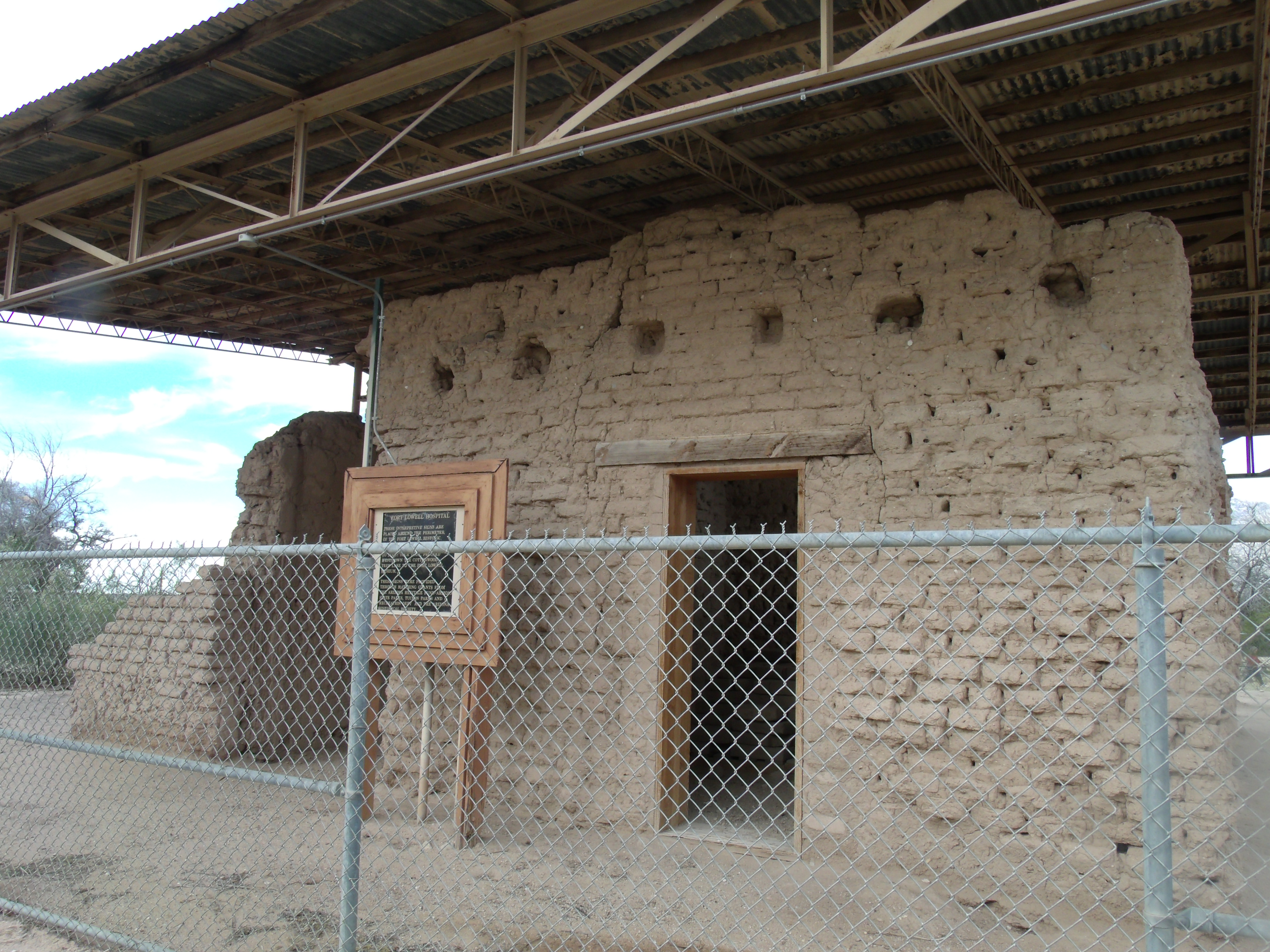
Ruins of the Fort Lowell hospital

- Fort Apache
- Fort Bowie
- Fort Buchanan
- Fort Crittenden
- Fort Defiance
- Fort Grant
- Fort Huachuca
- Fort Lowell
- Fort McDowell
- Fort Misery
- Fort Mojave
- The Old Fort (Mormon)
- Fort Tyson
- Fort Utah
- Fort Verde
- Fort Whipple
- Fort Yuma

=== Arkansas ===
- Fort Carlos III
- Fort Chaffee
- Fort Curtis
- Fort Logan H. Roots
- Fort Lookout
- Fort Smith

=== Connecticut ===
- Fort Griswold
- Fort Nathan Hale
- Fort Trumbull

=== Delaware ===
- Fort Casimir
- Fort Christina
- Fort Delaware
- Fort DuPont
- Fort Miles
- Fort Saulsbury

=== Florida ===
- Fort DeSoto

=== Georgia ===
- Fort Gordon
- Fort Frederica
- Fort Gaines
- Fort Gillem
- Fort Hawkins
- Fort James Jackson (aka Old Fort Jackson or Fort Oglethorpe), historic fort open to the public
- Fort King George
- Fort McAllister
- Fort McPherson
- Fort Benning
- Fort at Point Petre, aka Fort Point Peter
- Fort Pulaski
- Fort Screven
- Fort Stewart

=== Hawaii ===
- Fort DeRussy
- Fort Hase
- Fort Kamehameha
- Fort Ruger
- Russian Fort Elizabeth
- Schofield Barracks
- Fort Shafter

=== Idaho ===
- Fort Boise
- Camp Connor
- Fort Hall
- Fort Lapwai

=== Illinois ===
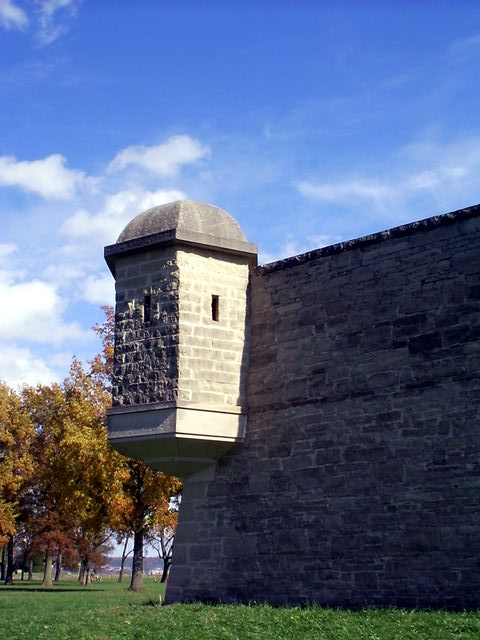
A bartizan on the reconstructed Ft de Chartres

- Fort Armstrong
- Fort de Chartres
- Fort Dearborn
- Fort Johnson
- Fort Kaskaskia
- Fort Massac

=== Indiana ===
- Fort Benjamin Harrison
- Fort Sackville
- Fort Knox
- Fort Miami
- Fort Ouiatenon
- Fort Patrick Henry
- Fort Vincennes
- Fort Wayne

=== Iowa ===
- Fort Atkinson
- Fort Des Moines I, II, and III
- Fort Dodge
- Fort Madison

=== Kansas ===
- Fort Aubrey
- Aubry's Post
- Fort Bain
- Barnesville's Post
- Fort Belmont
- Fort Blair (Fort Scott)
- Fort Brooks
- Burlingame's Fort
- Camp Ben Butler
- Fort de Cavagnial
- Chapman's Dugout
- Fort Clifton
- Fort Clinton
- Coldwater Grove's Post
- Council Grove's Post
- Camp Defiance
- Fort Dodge
- Fort Drinkwater
- Camp Drywood
- Eggert House
- Fort Ellsworth
- Fort Folly
- Fort Harker
- Fort Hays
- Fort Henning
- Camp Hunter
- Indian Home Guard Camp (Baxter Springs)
- Fort Insley
- Fort Lane
- Fort Larned
- Fort Leavenworth
- Fort Lincoln
- Fort Lincoln blockhouse
- Fort Lookout
- Fort McKean
- Fort Montgomery (Eureka)
- Fort Montgomery (Linn County)
- Mount Oread Civil War posts
- Fort Riley
- Fort Row
- Fort Scott
- Fort Simple
- Fort Solomon
- Fort Sully (Fort Leavenworth)
- Fort Sumner
- Fort Wallace
- Fort Zarah

=== Kentucky ===
- Bryan Station
- Corn Island
- Floyd's Station
- Fort Allen
- Fort Boonesborough
- Fort Campbell
- Fort DeWolf
- Fort Duffield
- Fort Hill, Frankfort
- Fort Jefferson
- Fort Knox
- Fort Harrod
- Fort Hartford
- Fort Heiman
- Fort Nelson, Jessamine County
- Fort Nelson, Louisville
- Fort-on-Shore
- Fort Thomas
- Fort Vienna
- Fort William
- Low Dutch Station
- Newport Barracks
- Springs Station

=== Louisiana ===
- Fort Dylan
- Fort Jackson
- Fort Polk
- Fort Pike
- Fort Proctor / Fort Beauregard
- Fort St. Philip

=== Maine ===
- Fort Allen
- Fort Baldwin
- Fort Edgecomb
- Fort Foster
- Fort George
- Fort Gorges
- Fort Halifax
- Fort Kent
- Fort Knox
- Fort Levett
- Fort Lyon
- Fort McClary
- Fort McKinley
- Fort O'Brien
- Fort Pentagouet
- Peaks Island Military Reservation
- Fort Popham
- Fort Preble
- Fort Scammel
- Fort Sullivan
- Fort Sumner
- Fort Western
- Fort Williams
- Fort William Henry

=== Maryland ===
- Fort Armistead
- Fort Carroll
- Fort Cumberland
- Fort Defiance
- Fort Detrick
- Fort Frederick
- Fort George G. Meade
- Fort Marshall
- Fort McHenry
- Fort Severn
- Fort Washington

=== Massachusetts ===
- Acushnet Fort
- Fort Andrew
- Fort Andrews
- Fort Banks
- Beverly Fort
- Cow Fort
- Fort Dawes
- Fort Defiance
- Fort Devens
- Fort Duvall
- East Point Military Reservation
- Eastern Point Fort
- Gilbert Heights Fort
- Fort Glover
- Fort Heath
- Fort Independence
- Fort Juniper
- Fort Lee
- Long Point Battery
- Fort Miller
- Fort Nichols
- Old Stone Fort
- Fort Philip
- Fort Phoenix
- Fort Pickering
- Fort Revere
- Fort Ridiculous
- Fort Rodman
- Fort Ruckman
- Fort at Salisbury Point
- Stage Fort
- Fort Standish (Boston)
- Fort Standish (Plymouth)
- Fort Strong
- Fort Taber
- Fort Useless
- Fort Warren
- Fort Washington
- Fort Winthrop

=== Michigan ===
- Fort de Buade
- Fort Detroit
- Fort Holmes
- Fort Mackinac
- Fort Miami
- Fort Michilimackinac
- Fort St. Joseph (Niles)
- Fort St. Joseph (Port Huron), rebuilt as Fort Gratiot
- Fort Wayne (Detroit)

=== Minnesota ===
- Fort Beauharnois
- Fort Duquesne
- Fort L'Huillier
- Fort Ridgely
- Fort Ripley
- Fort St. Charles
- Fort Snelling

=== Mississippi ===
- Fort Massachusetts
- Fort Maurepas

=== Missouri ===
- Fort Bellefontaine
- Fort Cap au Gris
- Fort Leonard Wood
- Fort Osage
- Jefferson Barracks

=== Montana ===
- Fort Assinniboine
- Fort C. F. Smith
- Fort Ellis
- Fort Keogh
- Fort Parker
- Fort William Henry Harrison
- Fort Missoula

=== Nebraska ===
- Fort Atkinson
- Camp Atlanta
- Bordeaux Trading Post
- Cabanne's Trading Post
- Fort Calhoun
- Columbus Post
- Fort Cottonwood
- Fort Crook
- Fontenelle's Post
- Post at Grand Island
- Fort Heath
- Fort Kearny
- Fort Kiowa
- Fort Lisa
- Fort McPherson
- Fort Mitchell
- Fort Niobrara
- Omaha Quartermaster Depot
- Fort Omaha
- Pilcher's Post
- Ponca Fort (Nanza)
- Fort Robinson
- Camp Sheridan
- Fort Sheridan
- Sherman Barracks
- Fort Sidney

=== Nevada ===
- Fort Churchill
- Fort McDermit
- Old Mormon Fort
- Fort Ruby
- Fort Schellbourne

=== New Hampshire ===
- Fort Constitution
- Fort Dearborn
- Fort at Number 4
- Fort Stark
- Fort Wentworth
- Fort William and Mary

=== New Jersey ===
- Fort Billingsport
- Fort Dix
- Highlands Military Reservation
- Fort Lee
- Fort Hancock
- Fort Mercer
- Fort Monmouth
- Fort Mott
- Fortifications of New Netherland
- Fort Nonsense

=== New Mexico ===
- Fort Bascom
- Fort Bayard
- Fort Craig
- Fort Cummings
- Fort Fauntleroy (aka Fort Wingate)
- Fort Fillmore
- Fort Marcy
- Fort Selden
- Fort Stanton
- Fort Sumner
- Fort Tularosa
- Fort Union
- Fort Wingate (aka Fort Lyon)

=== New York ===
- Fort Amsterdam
- Castle Clinton
- Fort Clinton
- Fort Columbus
- Fort Crown Point
- Fort Drum
- Fort Gansevoort
- Fort Gibson
- Fort Greene
- Fort Hamilton
- Camp Hero
- Fort Jay
- Fort Lafayette
- Fort Lévis
- Madison Barracks, begun as Fort Pike
- Fort Michie
- Fort Montgomery (Hudson River)
- Fort Montgomery (Lake Champlain)
- Forts of New Netherland
- Fort Niagara
- Fort Ontario
- Fort de La Présentation
- Fort Schuyler
- Fort Slocum
- Fort Stanwix, reconstructed living history museum
- Fort Terry
- Fort Ticonderoga
- Fort Tilden
- Fort Totten
- Fort Tyler
- Fort Wadsworth
- Fort Washington
- Fort William Henry
- Castle Williams
- Fort Wood
- Fort H. G. Wright

=== North Carolina ===
- Fort Caswell
- Fort Fisher
- Fort Greene
- Fort Hampton
- Fort Johnston
- Fort Bragg
- Fort Macon

=== North Dakota ===
- Fort Abercrombie
- Fort Abraham Lincoln
- Fort Buford
- Fort Clark
- Fort Mandan
- Fort Ransom
- Fort Stevenson
- Fort Totten
- Fort Union

=== Oklahoma ===
- Fort Arbuckle
- Fort Cobb
- Fort Gibson
- Camp Gruber
- Fort McCulloch
- Fort Nichols
- Fort Reno
- Fort Sill
- Fort Supply
- Fort Towson
- Fort Washita
- Fort Wayne

=== Oregon ===
- Fort Astoria
- Fort Clatsop
- Fort Dalles
- Fort Hoskins
- Fort Klamath
- Fort Lane
- Fort Stevens
- Fort William
- Fort Yamhill

=== Pennsylvania ===
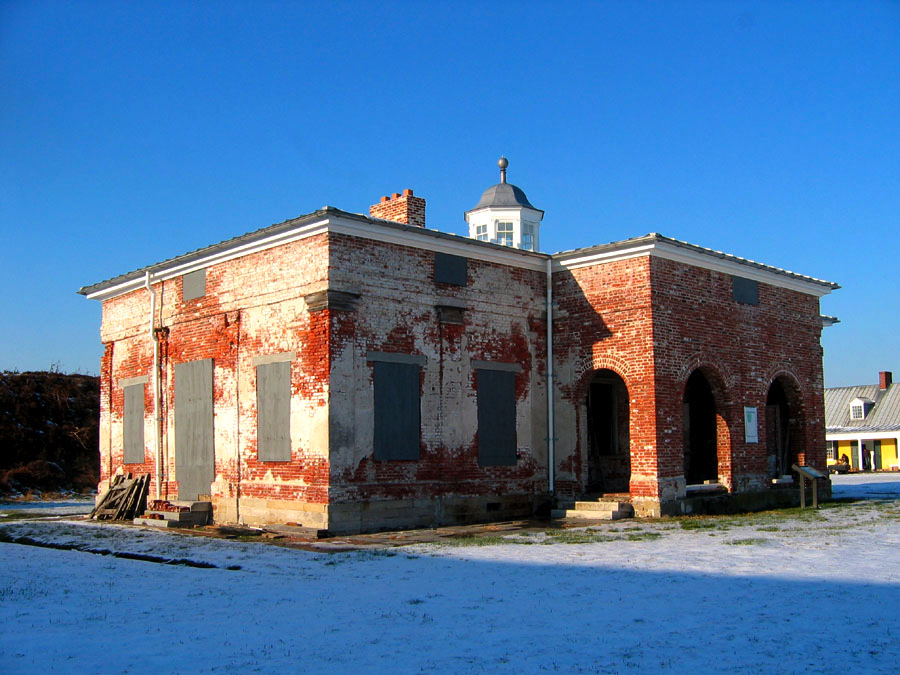
Fort Mifflin Commandant's House

- Fort Allen (Carbon County, Pennsylvania)
- Fort Allen (Westmoreland County, Pennsylvania)
- Fort Antes
- Fort Augusta
- Fort Bedford
- Fort Black
- Fort Bosley
- Fort Deshler
- Fort Dickinson
- Fort Dupuy
- Fort Duquesne
- Fort Gaddis
- Fort Granville
- Fort Halifax
- Fort Hunter
- Fort Hyndshaw
- Fort Indiantown Gap
- Fort Jones (Mount Oliver)
- Fort Juniata Crossing
- Fort Lafayette
- Fort Laughlin
- Fort Le Boeuf
- Fort Ligonier
- Fort Loudoun
- Fort Machault
- Fort McIntosh
- Fort Mifflin
- Fort Necessity
- Fort Piper
- Fort Pitt
- Fort Presque Isle
- Fort Prince George
- Fort Robert Smalls
- Fort Roberdeau
- Fort Shirley
- Fort Venango
- Forty Fort
- Harbor Defenses of the Delaware
- Light's Fort
- List of forts in Washington County, Pennsylvania
- Redstone Old Fort
- Spark's Fort

=== Puerto Rico ===
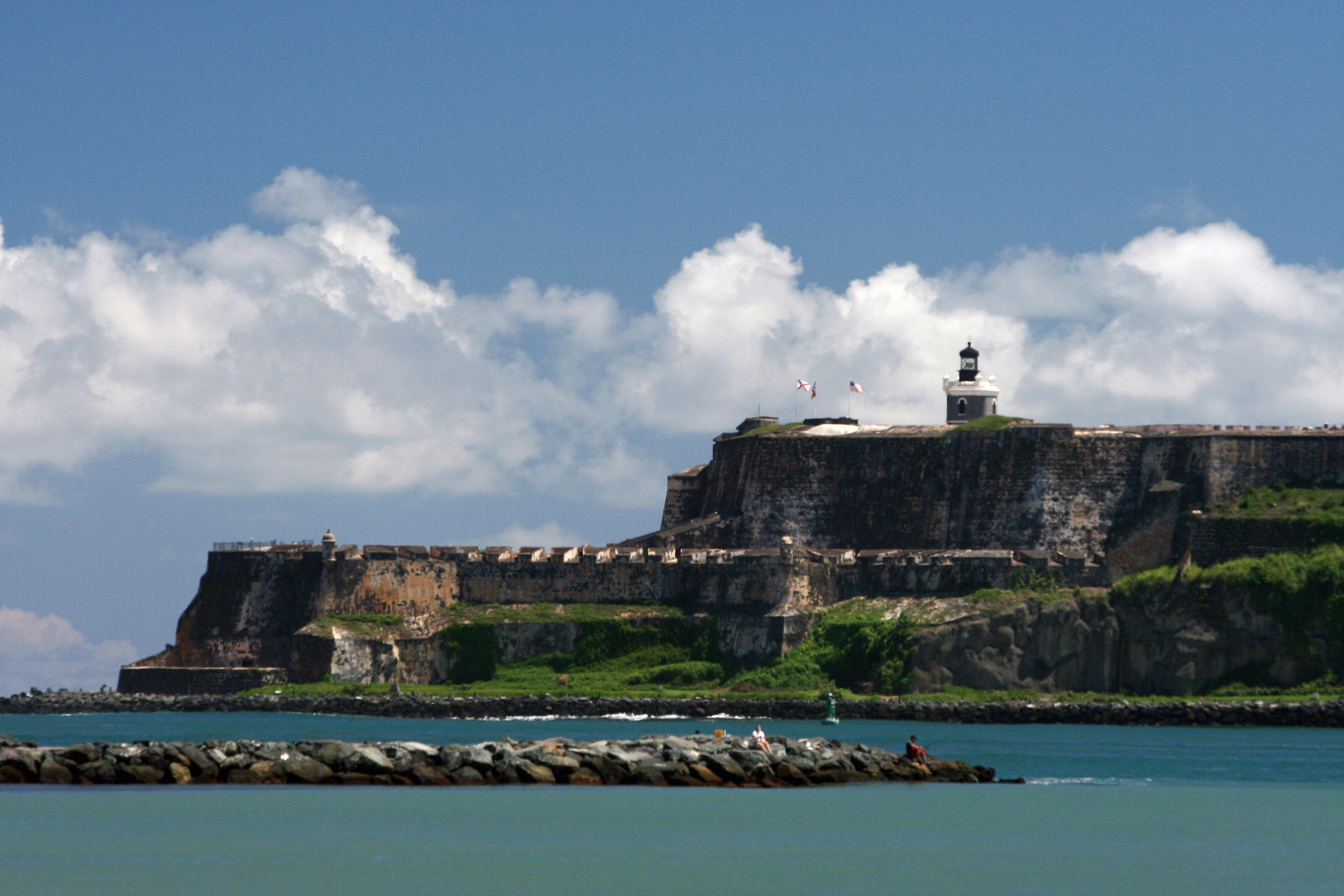
Castillo San Felipe del Morro in Old San Juan, Puerto Rico

- Fort Amezquita
- Fort Buchanan, Puerto Rico
- El Cañuelo
- Castillo San Cristóbal
- Castillo San Felipe del Morro
- Fortín de San Gerónimo
- Fuerte de Vieques

=== Rhode Island ===
- Fort Adams
- Fort Anne
- Fort Barton
- Fort Burnside
- Fort Church
- Fort Dumpling
- Fort Getty
- Fort Greble
- Fort Greene (Narragansett)
- Fort Greene (Newport)
- Fort Hamilton
- Fort Kearny
- Fort Mansfield
- Fort Ninigret
- Queen's Fort
- Fort Varnum
- Fort Wetherill
- Fort Wolcott

=== South Carolina ===
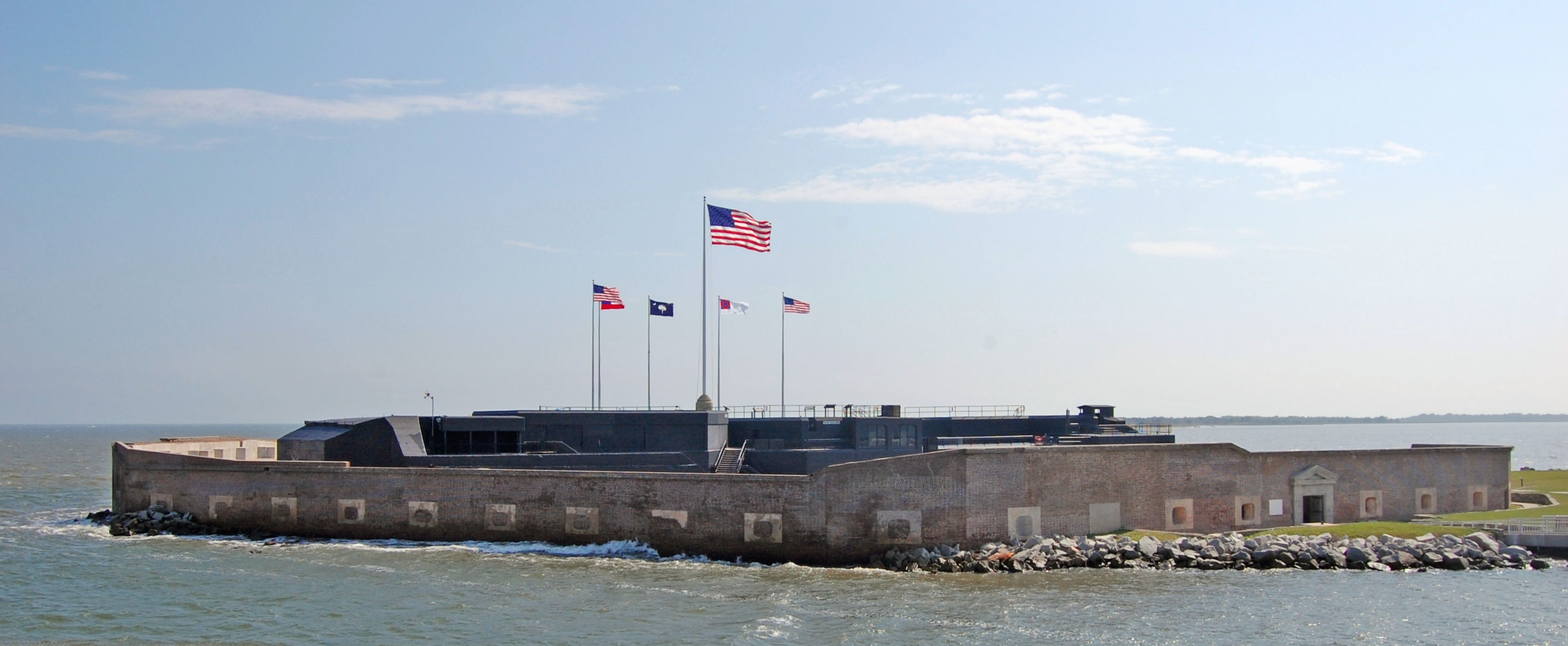
Fort Sumter

- The Battery
- Fort Charlotte
- Fort Fremont
- Fort Howell
- Fort Jackson
- Fort Lyttelton, also called Fort Marion
- Fort Motte
- Fort Moultrie
- Old Ninety Six and Star Fort
- Castle Pinckney
- Fort Prince George
- Fort Sumter
- Fort Wagner
- Fort Walker, also called Fort Welles

=== South Dakota ===
- Fort Meade
- Fort Randall
- Fort Sully

=== Texas ===
- The Alamo
- Fort Bliss
- Fort Brown
- Fort Hood
- Fort Concho
- Fort Crockett
- Fort D. A. Russell
- Fort Davis
- Fort Saint Louis
- Fort Wolters
- Fort Worth

=== Utah ===
- Fort Buenaventura
- Cove Fort
- Fort Deseret
- Fort Douglas
- Fort Duchesne
- Fort Cameron
- Fort Utah

=== Virginia ===
- Fort Albany
- Fort Pickett
- Craney Island Fort
- Fort Ethan Allen
- Fort Eustis
- Fort Lee
- Fort Hunt
- Fort John Custis
- Fort Loudoun
- Fort Monroe
- Fort Nelson
- Fort Norfolk
- Fort Myer
- Fort Richardson
- Battery Rodgers
- Fort Scott
- Fort Story
- Fort A.P. Hill
- Fort Ward
- Fort Wool

=== Virgin Islands (U.S.) ===
- Fort Christian
- Fort Christiansværn
- Fort Frederik
- Fort Segarra
- Fort Willoughby
- Fortsberg

=== Washington ===
- Fort Columbia
- Fort Colville
- Fort Dent
- Fort George Wright
- Fort Lawton
- Fort Lewis
- Fort Nez Percés (aka Old Fort Walla Walla)
- Fort Nisqually
- Fort Okanogan
- Fort Simcoe
- Fort Vancouver
- Fort Walla Walla
- Fort Ward
- Fort Worden

=== Washington, D.C. ===
- Fort DeRussy
- Fort McNair
- Fort Stanton
- Fort Stevens
- Fort Totten
- The Pentagon

=== West Virginia ===
- Fort Ashby
- Fort Milroy
- Fort Pearsall
- Prickett's Fort
- Fort Randolph

=== Wisconsin ===
- Fort Crawford
- Fort Howard
- Fort McCoy
- Fort Shelby/Fort McKay
- Fort Winnebago
- Fort Atkinson

=== Wyoming ===
- Fort Bridger
- Fort Caspar
- Fort D.A. Russell
- Fort Fetterman
- Fort Francis E. Warren, now the Francis E. Warren Air Force Base
- Fort Halleck
- Fort Laramie
- Fort Phil Kearny
- Fort Platte
- Fort Reno
- Fort Sanders
- Camp Stambaugh
- Fort Supply
- Fort Washakie
- Fort Yellowstone

=== Cities and areas with "Fort" in the name ===
- Fort Atkinson, Wisconsin
- Fort Bragg, California
- Fort Bridger, Wyoming
- Fort Collins, Colorado
- Fort Garland, Colorado
- Fort Hunt, Virginia
- Fort Laramie, Wyoming
- Fort Lauderdale, Florida
- Fort Lawn, South Carolina
- Fort Lee, New Jersey
- Fort Lupton, Colorado
- Fort Mill, South Carolina
- Fort Morgan, Colorado
- Fort Myers, Florida
- Fort Pierre, South Dakota
- Fort Rock, Oregon
- Fort Smith, Arkansas
- Fort Stockton, Texas
- Fort Thomas, Kentucky
- Fort Walton Beach, Florida
- Fort Washakie, Wyoming
- Fort Wayne, Indiana
- Fort Worth, Texas

== Virgin Islands (British) ==
- Fort Burt, Tortola
- Fort Charlotte, Tortola
- Fort George, Tortola
- Fort Purcell, Tortola
- Fort Recovery, Tortola
- Road Town Fort, Tortola
- Whelk Point Fort, Tortola

== See also ==
- List of castles
- List of fortifications
