= Chaleshtar Castle =

Castle in Chaharmahal and Bakhtiari Province, Iran

Chaleshtar castle
- قلعه چالشتر
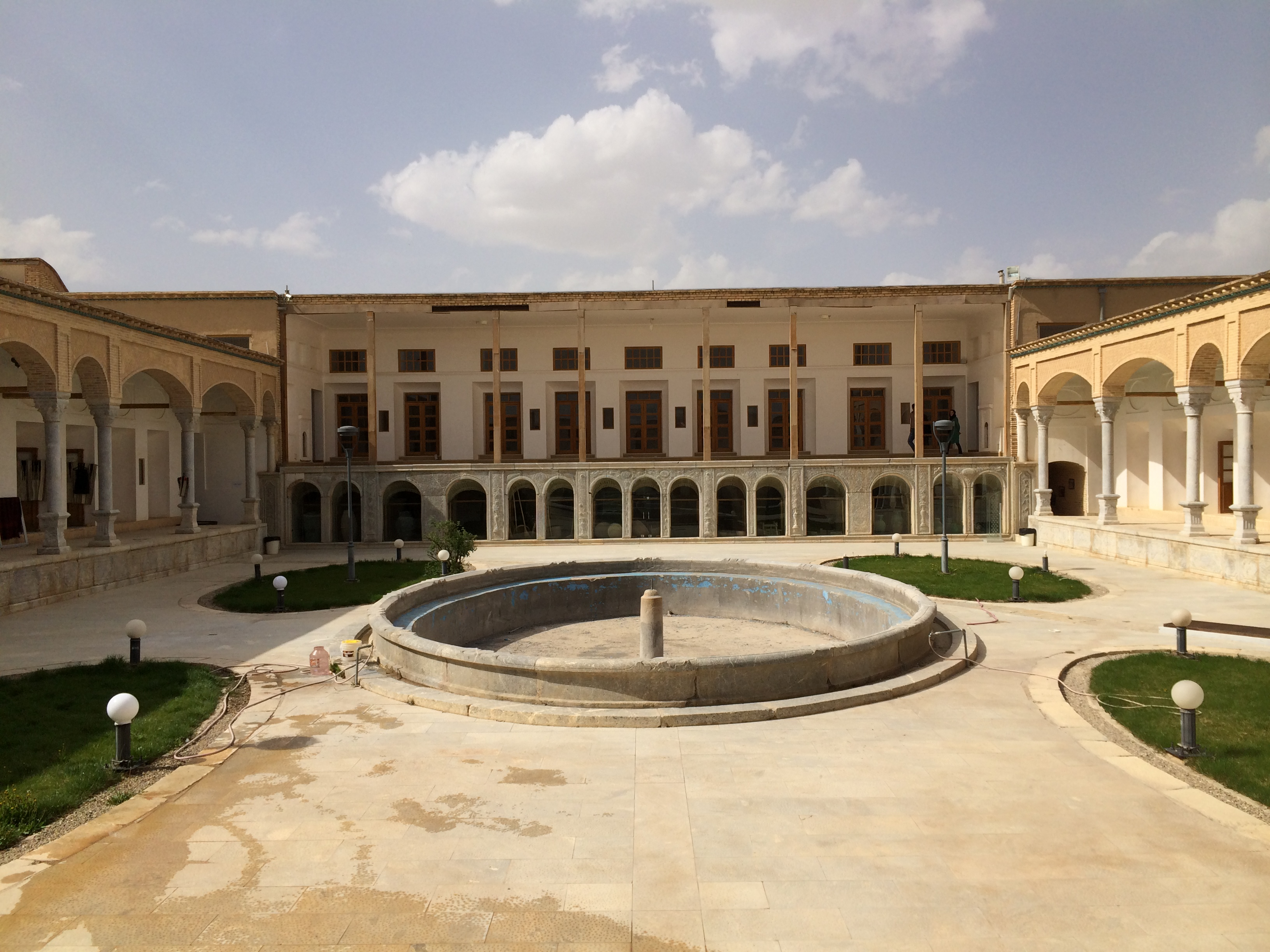

General information
- Type: Castle
- Location: Shahrekord County, Iran
- Coordinates: 32.3779°N 50.7876°E

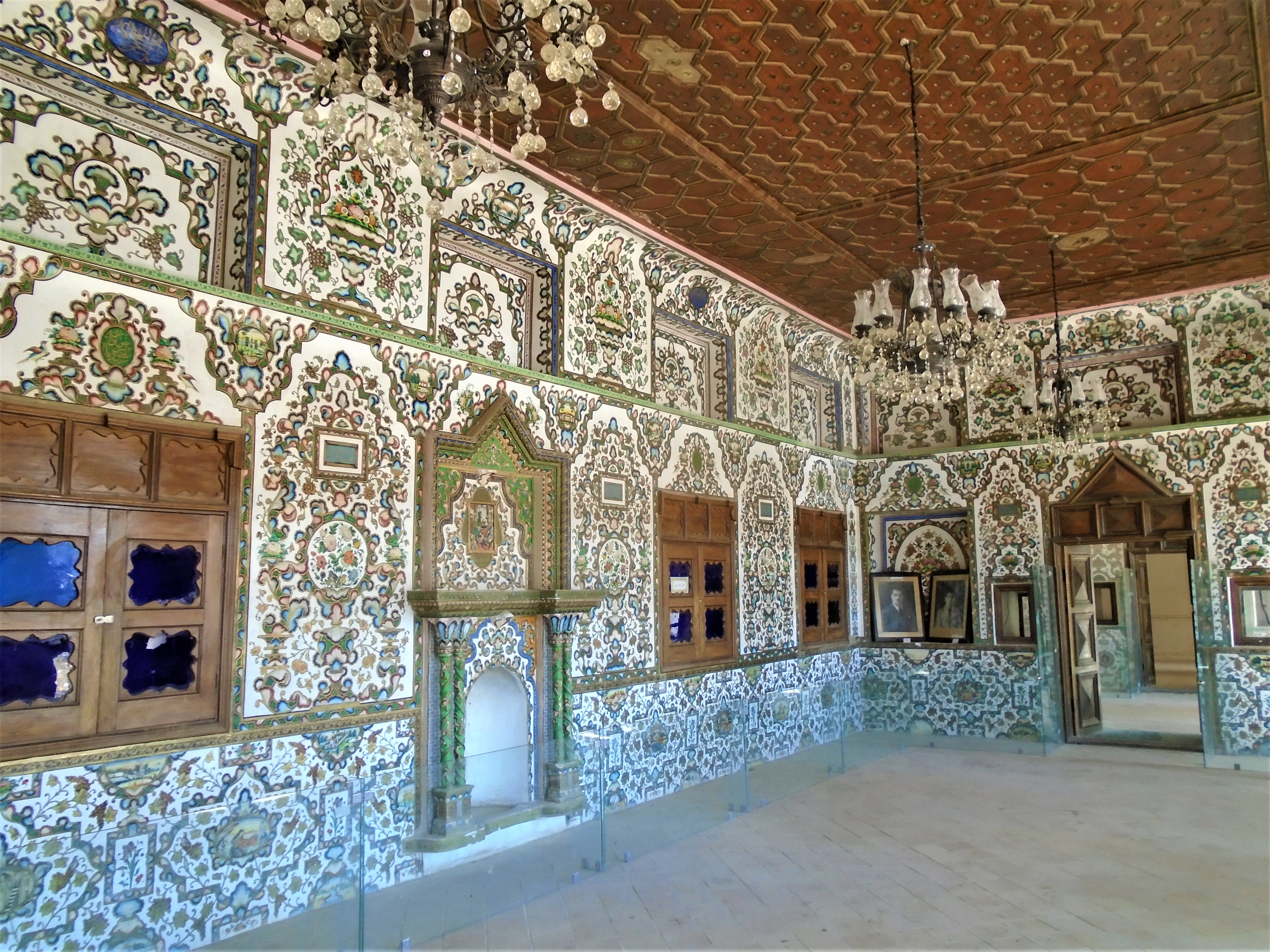

Chaleshtar castle (Persian: قلعه چالشتر) is a historical castle located in Shahrekord County in Chaharmahal and Bakhtiari Province. It was built in the Qajar era.
