= Espakeh Castle =

Castle in Sistan and Baluchestan Province, Iran

Espakeh castle
- قلعه اسپکه
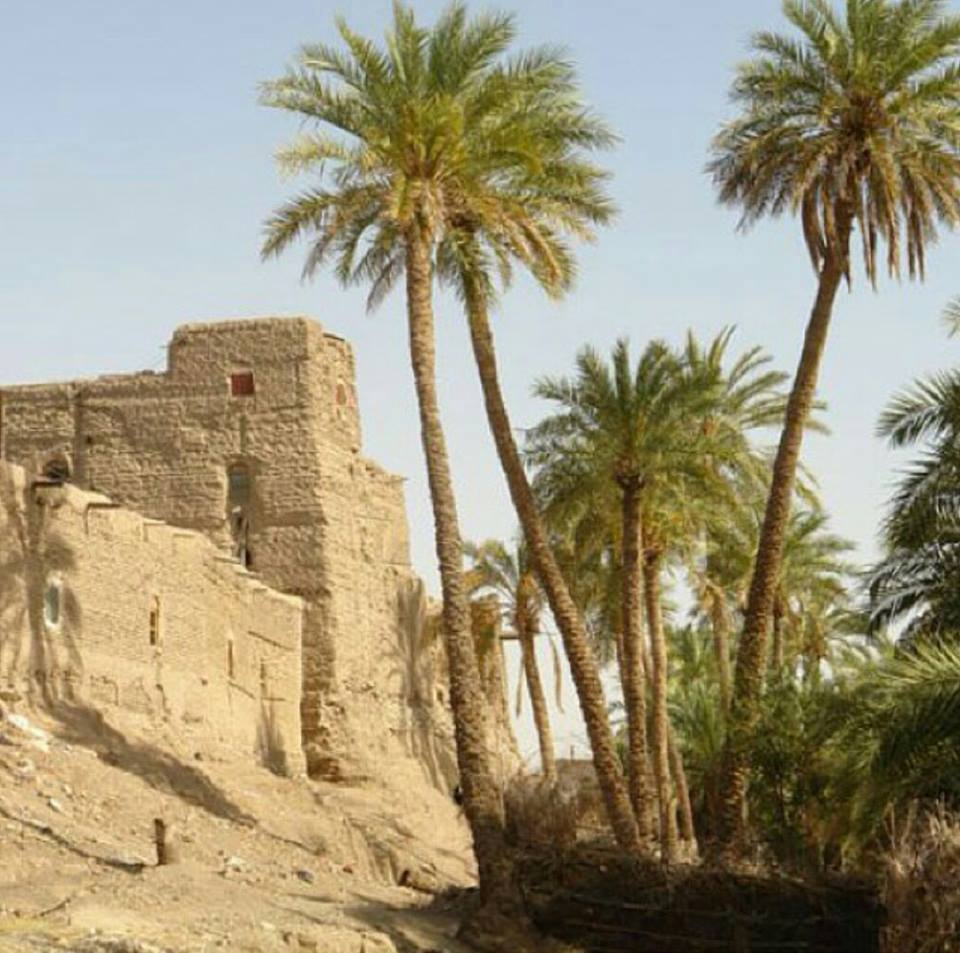
- Interactive map of the Espakeh castle area

General information
- Type: Castle
- Location: Nik Shahr County, Iran

Espakeh castle (Persian: قلعه اسپکه) is a historical castle located in Nik Shahr County in Sistan and Baluchestan Province, The longevity of this fortress dates back to the Middle Ages Historical periods after Islam.
