= Jushin Castle =

Castle in East Azerbaijan Province, Iran

- قلعه جوشین (Persian)
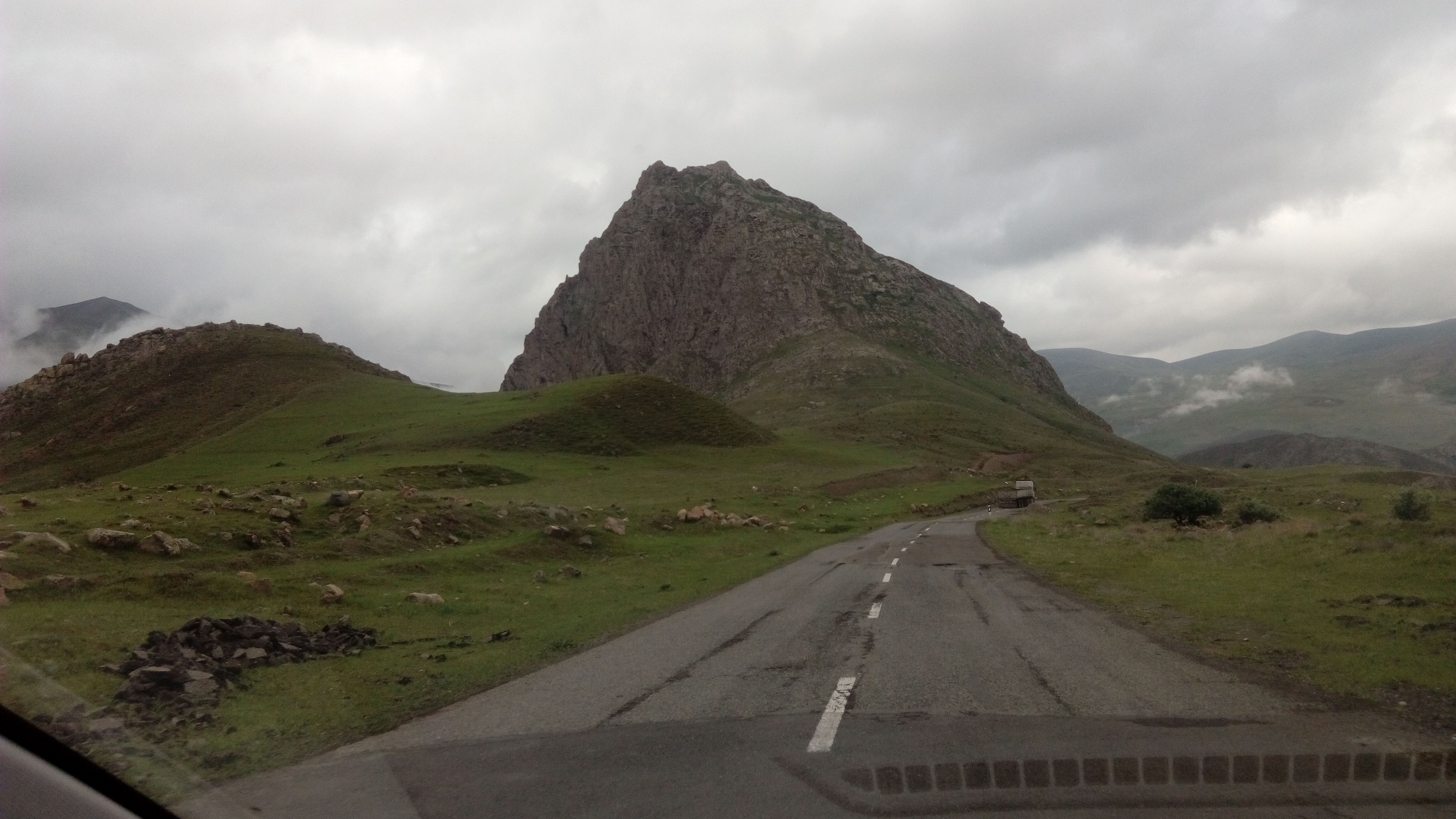

- Location within Iran Location within Azerbaijan
- Interactive map of Jushin Castle
- 38°37′N 46°25′E
- Location: Varzaqan County Iran

Jushin Castle (Persian: قلعه جوشین) is a historical castle located in Varzaqan County in East Azerbaijan Province, The longevity of this fortress dates back to the Sasanian Empire.
