= Mozaffarabad Castle =

Castle in Qom Province, Iran

Mozaffarabad castle
- قلعه مظفرآباد
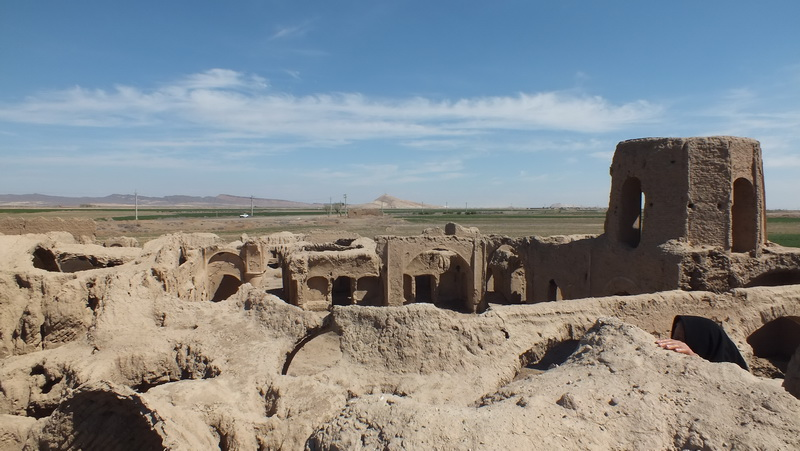
- Interactive map of the Mozaffarabad castle area

General information
- Type: Castle
- Location: Qom County, Iran

Mozaffarabad Castle (Persian: قلعه مظفرآباد) is a historical castle located in Qom County in Qom Province, The longevity of this fortress dates back to the Qajar dynasty.
