= Robat Castle =

Castle in Yazd Province, Iran

- قلعه رباط
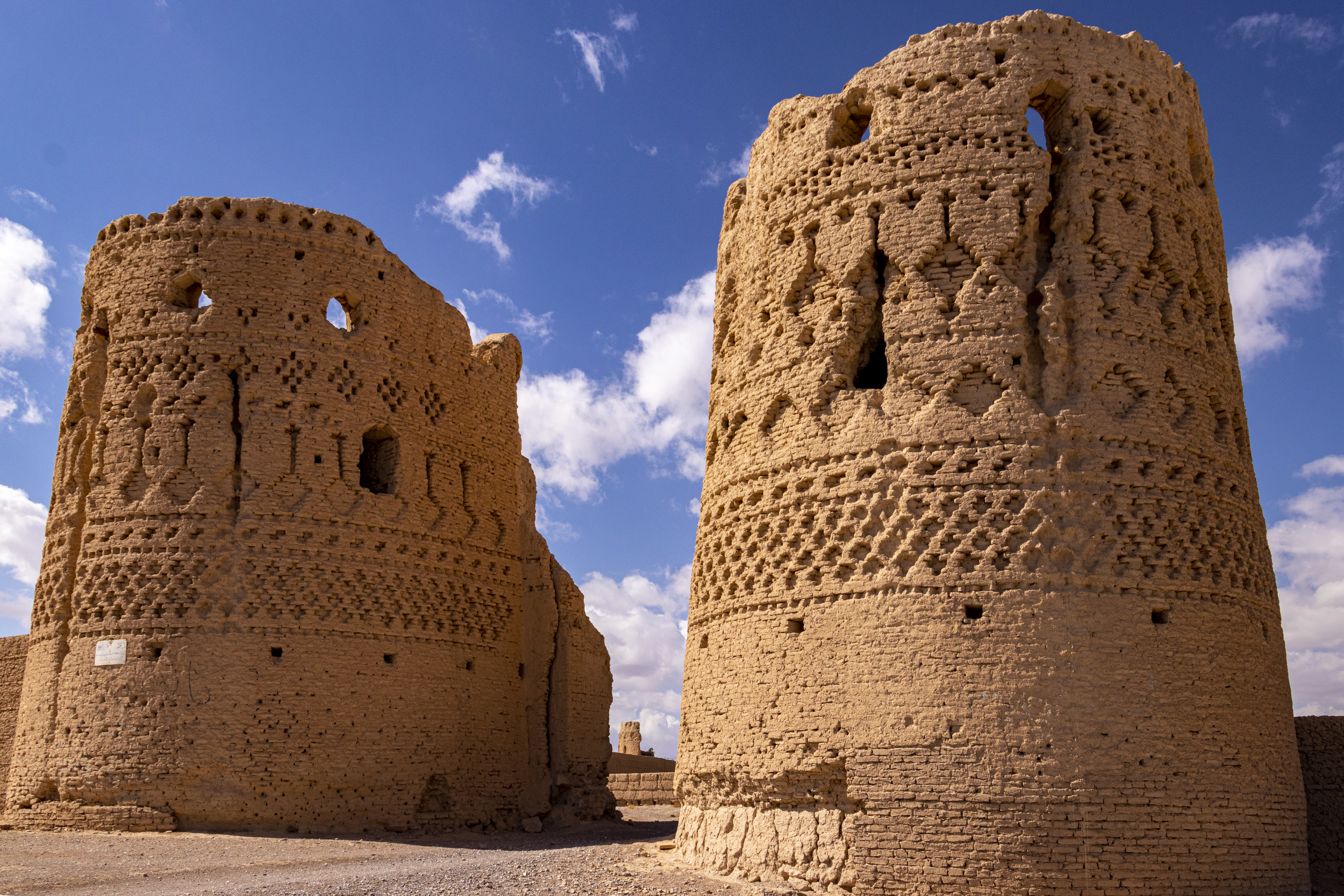
- Interactive map of the Robat Castle area

General information
- Type: Castle
- Location: Abarkuh, Iran
- Coordinates: 31°07′43″N 53°15′48″E

Robat Castle (Persian: قلعه رباط) is a historical castle located in Abarkuh County in Yazd Province, The longevity of this fortress dates back to the Safavid dynasty.
