= Forte de São Mateus do Cabo Frio =

- Cabo Frio, Rio de Janeiro in Brazil
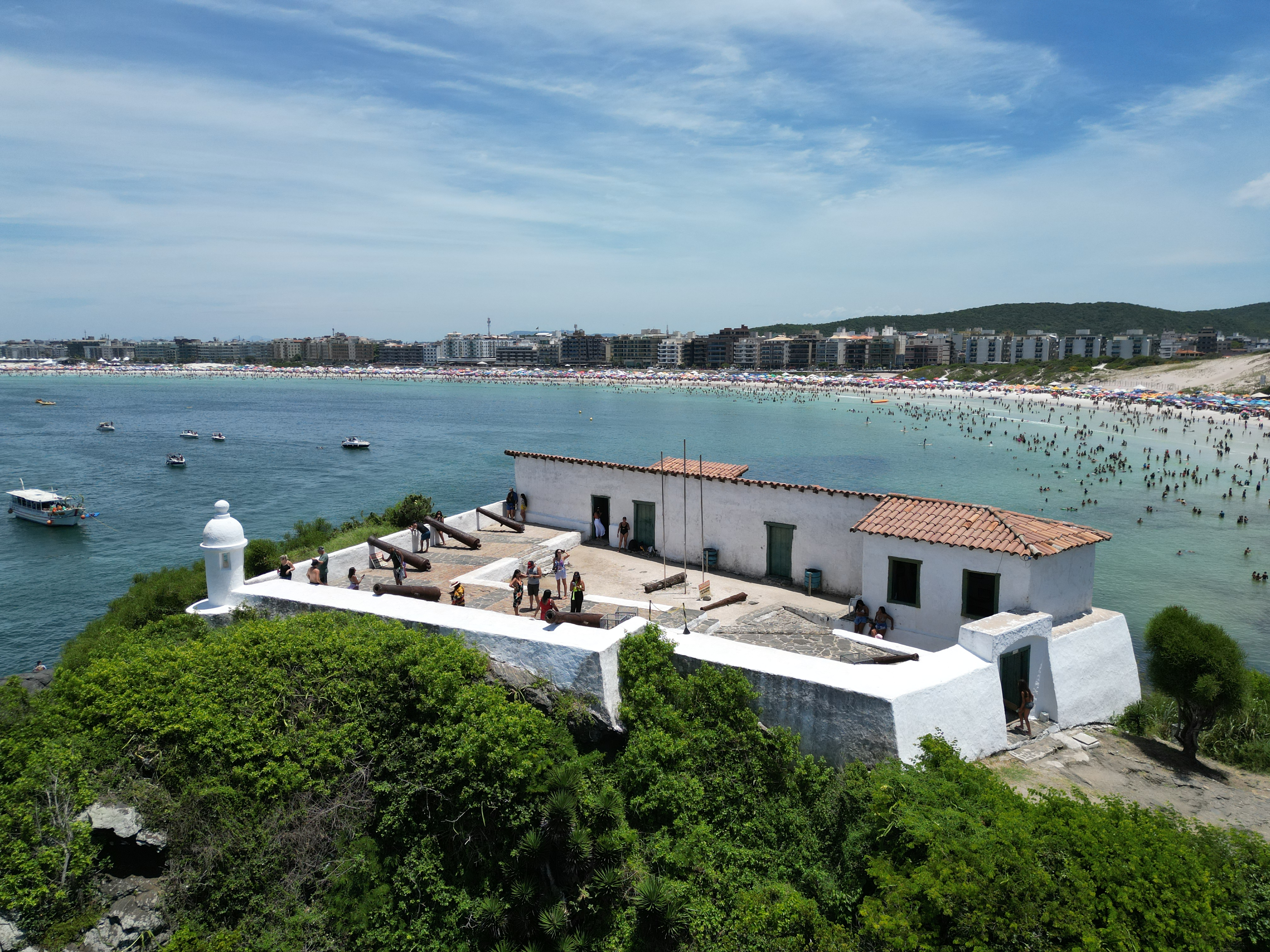
- View of fort

Site information
- Type: Fort
- Open to the public: Yes

Location
- Location of Forte de São Mateus in Brazil
- Coordinates: 22.885267°S 42.007988°W

Forte de São Mateus do Cabo Frio is a fort located Cabo Frio, Rio de Janeiro in Brazil.

== See also ==
- Military history of Brazil
