= Qahqah Castle =

Castle in Kerman Province, Iran

- قلعه قهقه

General information
- Type: Castle
- Location: Ravar County, Iran
- Coordinates: 31.29°N 57.06°E
- Renovation cost

Iran National Heritage List
- Official name: Qahqah Fort
- Type: Ruins
- Designated: 1966
- Reference no.: 498
- Conservation organization: Cultural Heritage, Handicrafts and Tourism Organization of Iran

Qahqah Castle (Persian: قلعه قهقه) is a historical castle located in Ravar County in Kerman Province, Iran. The longevity of this fortress dates back to the Sasanian Empire.
