= Kalat Ahram Castle =

Castle in Bushehr Province, Iran

Kalat Ahram castle
- قلعه کلات اهرم
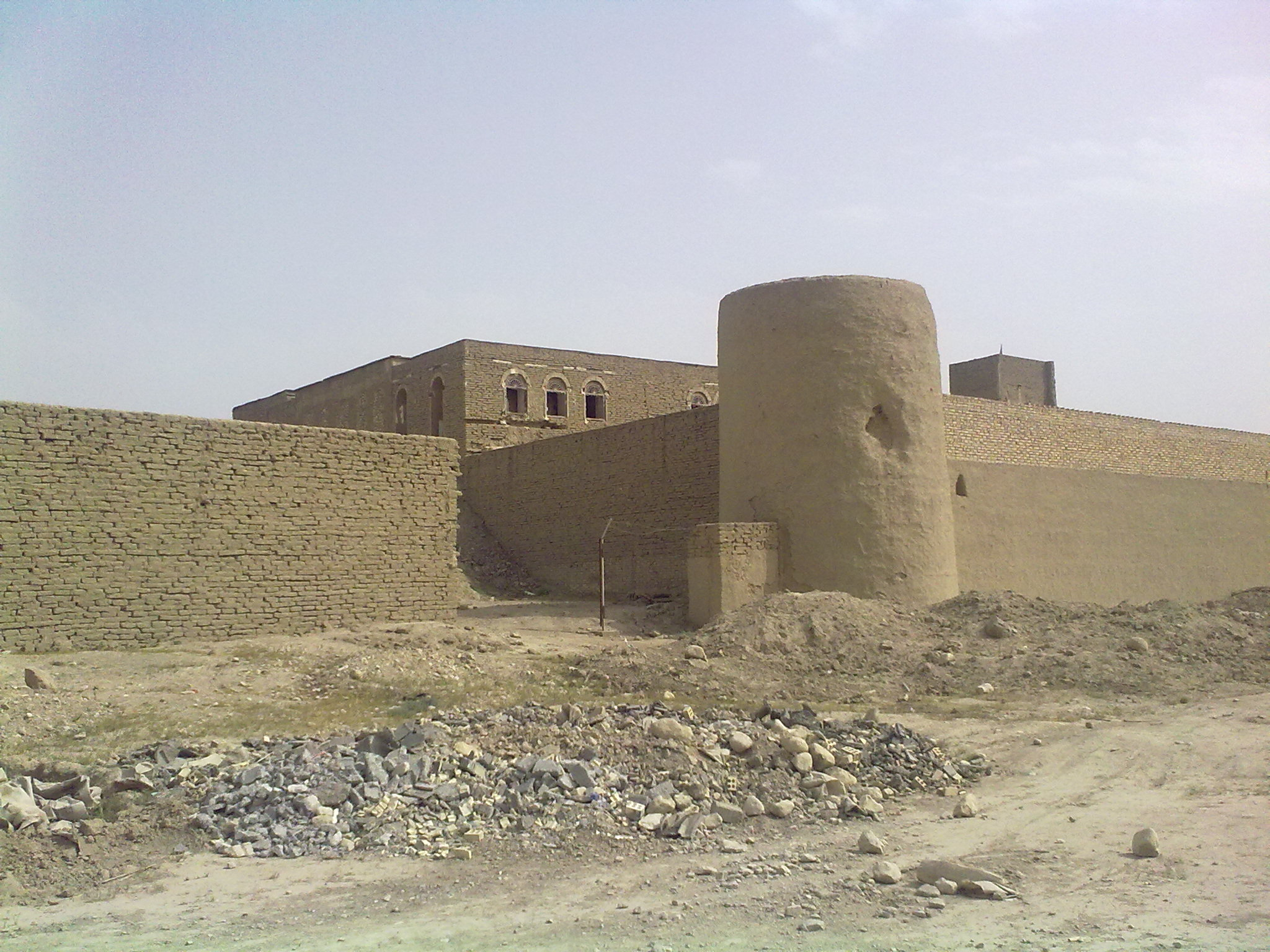
- Interactive map of the Kalat Ahram castle area

General information
- Type: Castle
- Location: Tangestan County, Iran
- Coordinates: 28.8859°N 51.2785°E

Kalat Ahram castle (Persian: قلعه کلات اهرم) is a historical castle located in Ahram, Tangestan County in Bushehr Province, Iran. The longevity of this fortress dates back to the Qajar dynasty.
