= Geli Castle =

Qom Province, Iran

- قلعه گلی
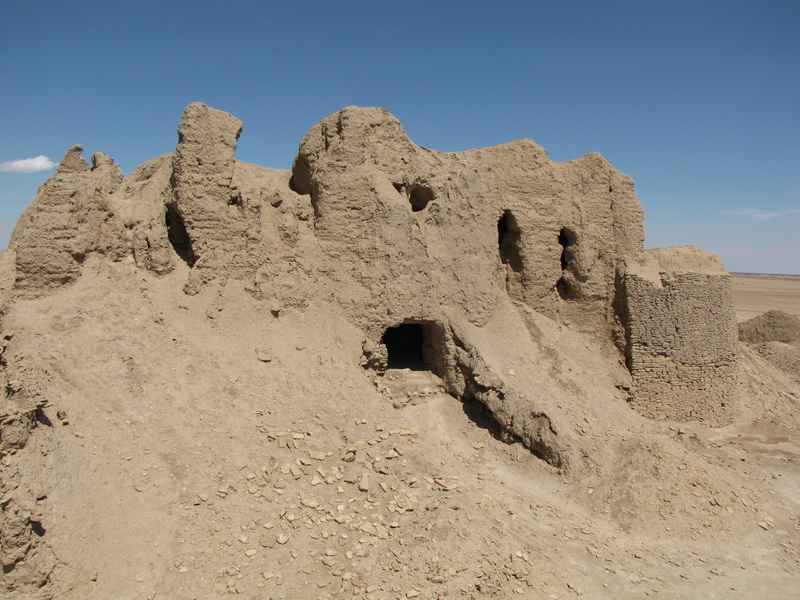

- Location within Iran
- Interactive map of the Geli Castle area

General information
- Type: Castle
- Location: Qom County, Iran
- Coordinates: 34°50′29″N 51°08′47″E

Geli Castle (Persian: قلعه گلی) is a Parthian era historic castle in Qom County, Qom province.
