= Muelle de Gallineras =

Coordinates: 36°26′25″N 6°12′22″W

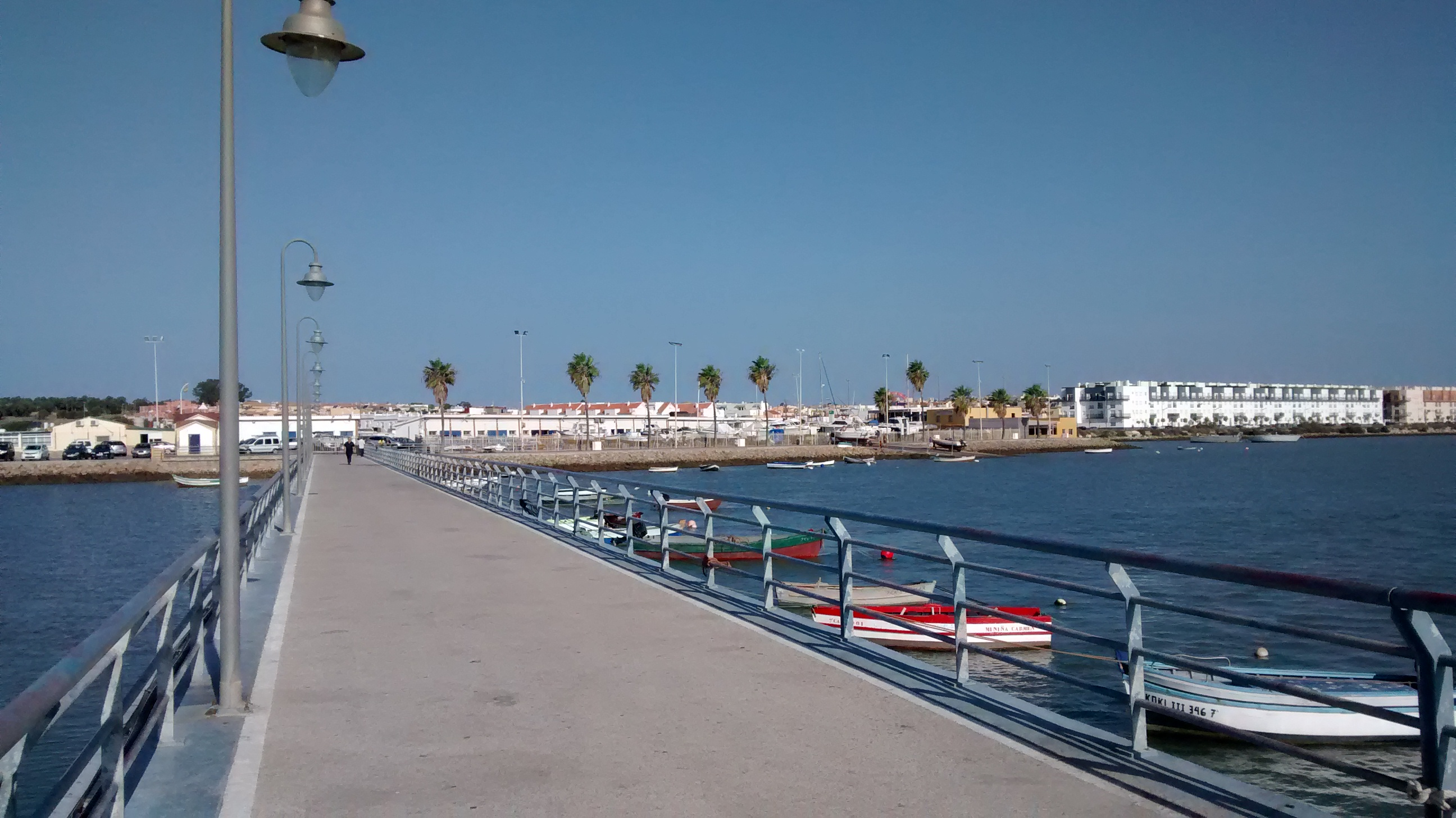
Muelle de Gallineras

Muelle de Gallineras is a fishing port and marina located in San Fernando in the Province of Cádiz, Andalusia, Spain. It was used in Roman times. On 23 October 304, Calventius Viator sailed from here to Africa after being martyred. During the French siege there were two defensive batteries, one lower and one higher. Gallerinas today is also the name of a district (barrio) of the city.
