= Machi Castle =

Castle in Sistan and Baluchestan Province, Iran

Machi castle
- قلعه مچی
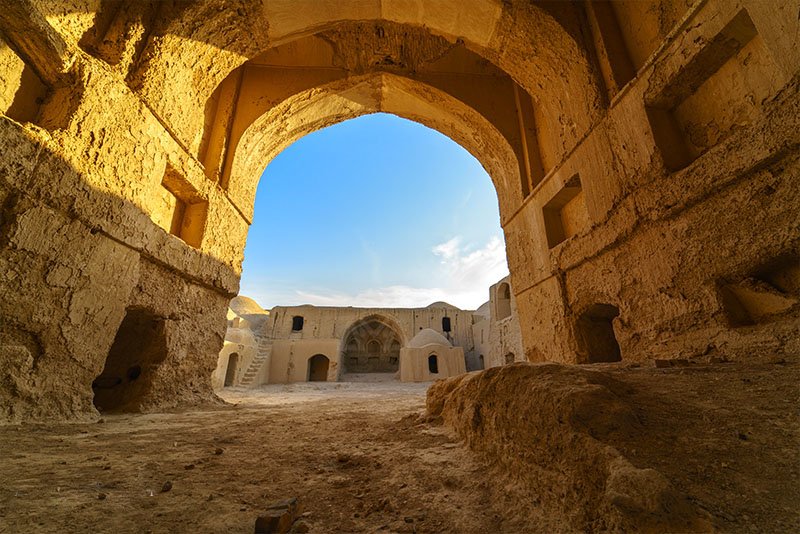
- Interactive map of the Machi castle area

General information
- Type: Castle
- Location: Hamun County, Iran

Machi Castle (Persian: قلعه مچی) is a historical castle located in Hamun County in the Sistan and Baluchestan province of Iran. The fortress dates back to the Safavid dynasty.
