= Muralla urbana de Marbella =

Fort in southern Spain

Coordinates: 36.5113°N 4.8841°W

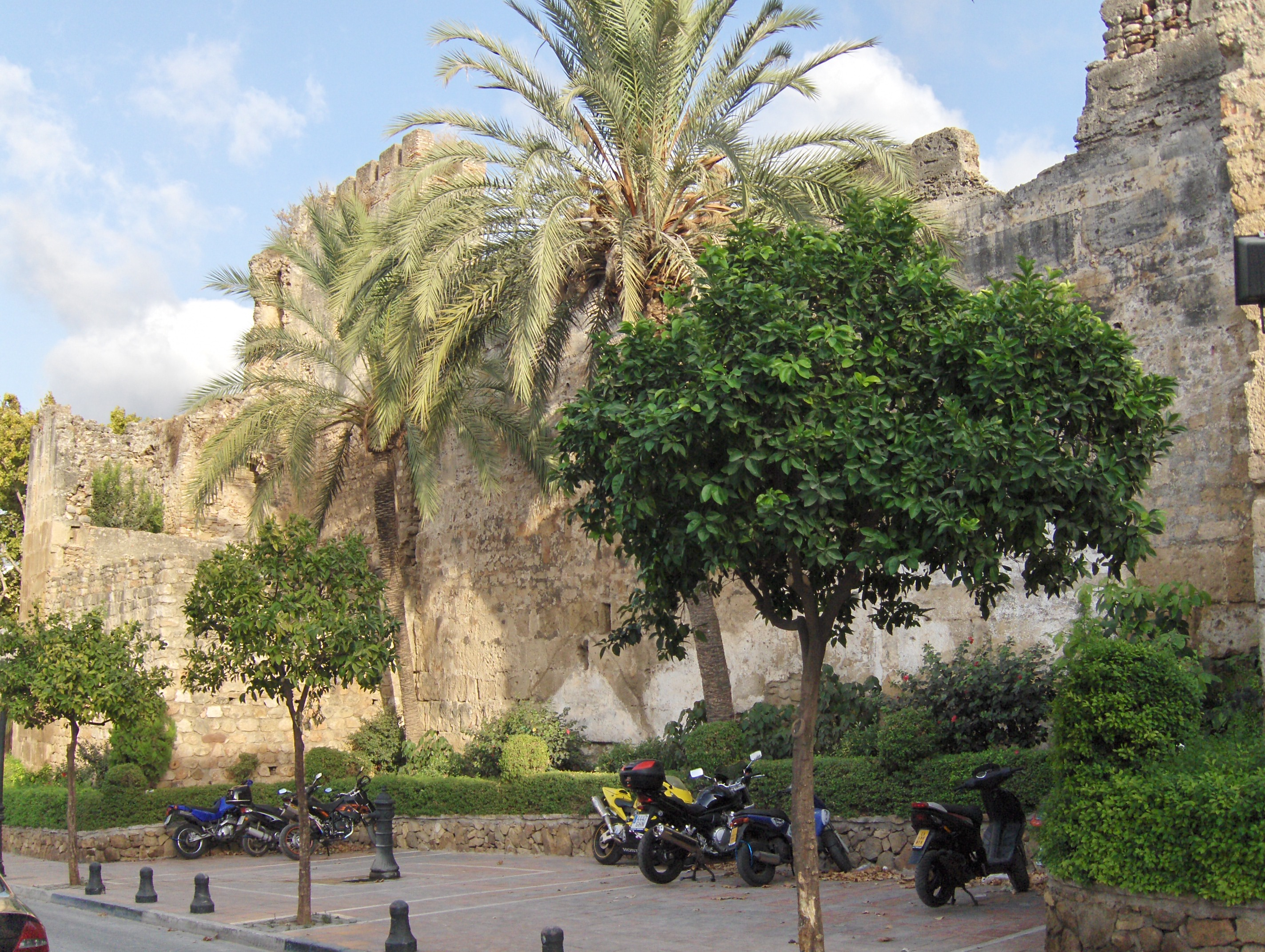
Muralla urbana de Marbella.

The Muralla urbana is a fortress in Marbella, southern Spain. It was built in the 10th century, and contained the old Arab medina, which today corresponds to the old part of the city. The fort was accessible through three entrances: the Puerta de Ronda, the Puerta de Málaga and the Puerta del Mar, and was composed of at least 20 towers. Currently, there are remains of the fort, though part of the wall has been restored.
