= Council Grove's Post =

Trading post that operated in Kansas, US

Council Grove's Post is a trading post on the Santa Fe Trail that operated in Council Grove, Kansas. It was established around 1861 and decommissioned around 1864, with ties to the Civil War.

== History ==
Council Grove, Kansas, was a town with mixed loyalties during the Civil War. While the majority of the area's citizens supported the Union cause, quite a number of residents had ties to the south and many sympathized with the Confederacy. In April and May 1863 Confederate guerrillas camped near Council Grove and the town felt threatened by them before they left.

In 1863 or possibly earlier Union soldiers were stationed at Council Grove and they built a blockhouse, probably in 1864. Probably there were times when the troops were removed. In spring and summer 1864 troops were stationed at Council Grove to help protect the Santa Fe Trail, which passed through Council Grove. Indians had been attacking travelers along the trail.

The post at Council Grove operated until at least the end of September 1864. It probably closed soon after, as no official reports exist after the September 30 report by the post commander.
