= Cranberry Point Battery =

Coordinates: 46°15′43.23″N 60°12′25.25″W

Cranberry Point Battery in Sydney Mines, Nova Scotia

Cranberry Point Battery was a First World War era coastal defence battery which defended the approaches to Sydney Harbour.

It originally consisted of two 4.7 inch quick firing guns which were later removed and replaced with a concrete observation tower and two concrete searchlight emplacements.
