= Chanef Castle =

Castle in Sistan and Baluchestan Province, Iran

Chanef castle
- قلعه چانف
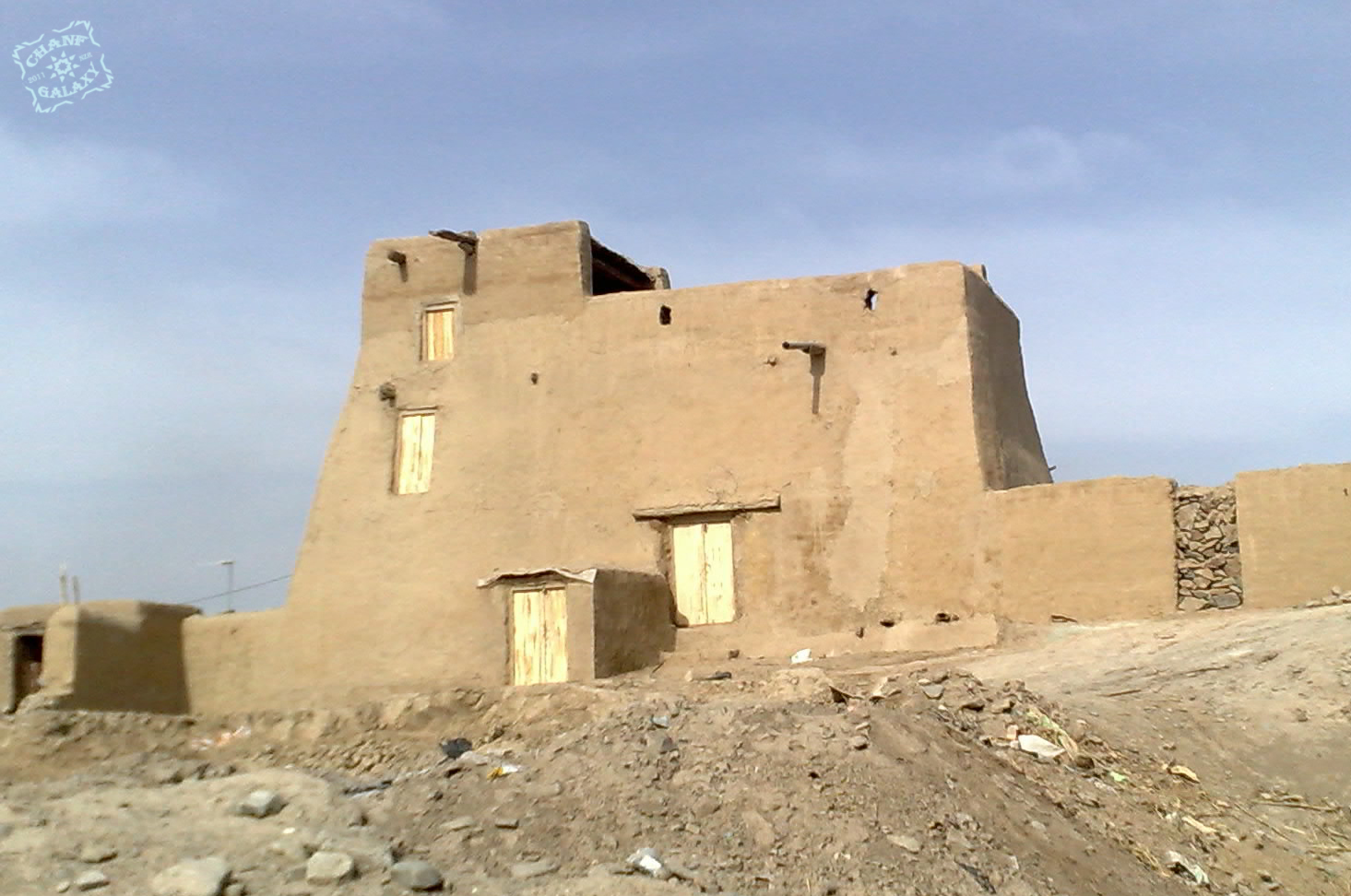
- Interactive map of the Chanef castle area

General information
- Type: Castle
- Location: Nik Shahr County, Iran

Chanef castle (Persian: قلعه چانف) is a historical castle located in Nik Shahr County in Sistan and Baluchestan Province, The longevity of this fortress dates back to the Qajar dynasty.
