= Keshit Castle =

Castle in Kerman Province, Iran

Keshit castle
- قلعه کشیت
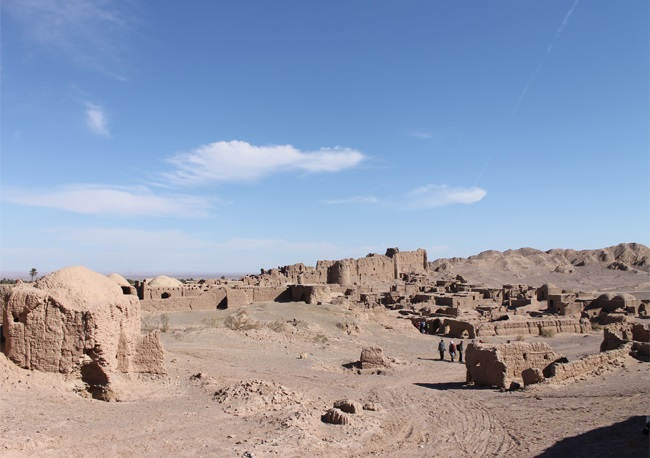
- Interactive map of the Keshit castle area

General information
- Type: Castle
- Location: Kerman County, Iran

Keshit castle (Persian: قلعه کشیت) is a historical castle located in Kerman County in Kerman Province, The longevity of this fortress dates back to the Seljuk Empire.
