= Ernan Castle =

Castle in Yazd province, Iran

Ernan castle
- قلعه ارنان
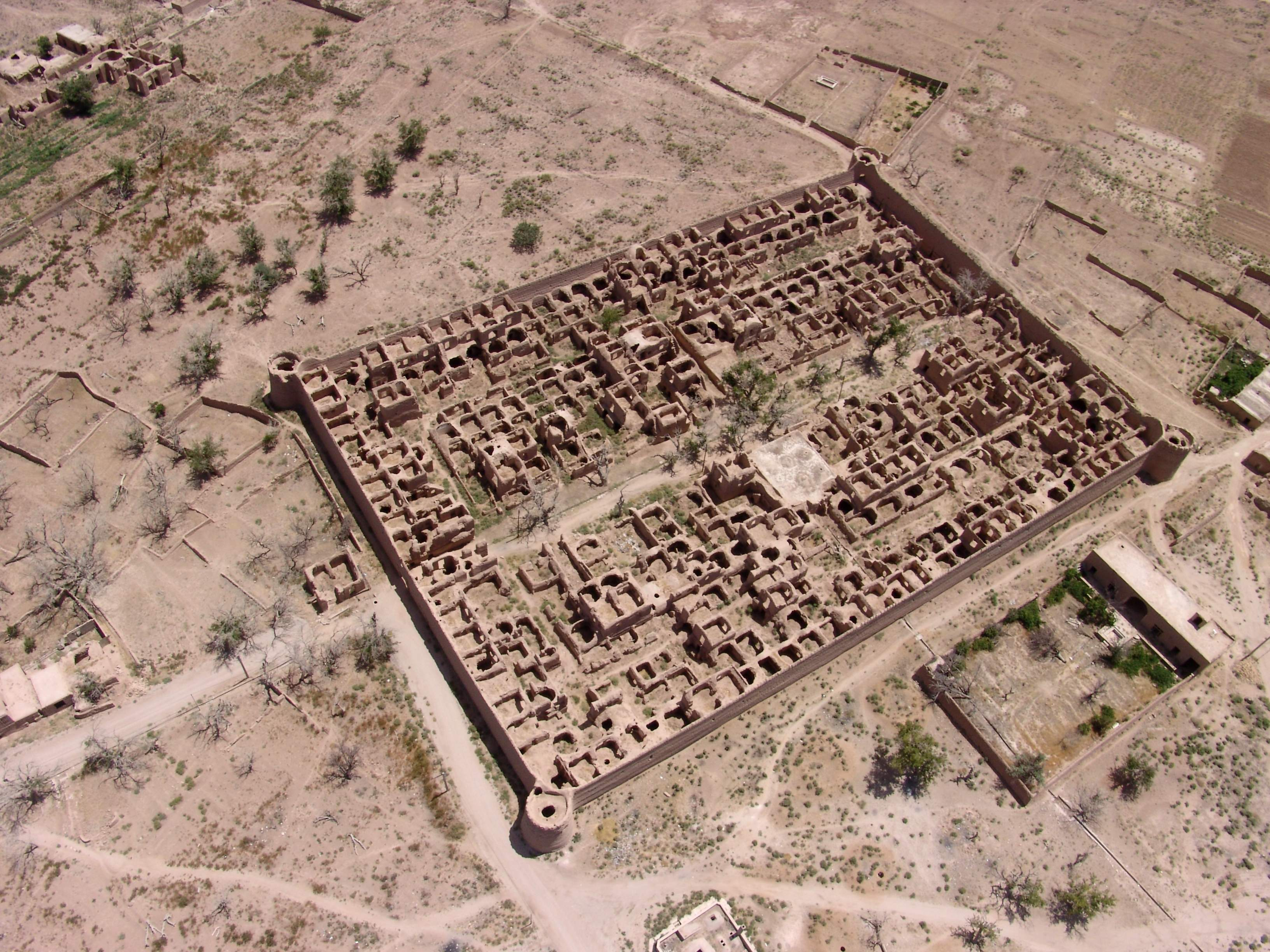
- Interactive map of the Ernan castle area

General information
- Type: Castle
- Location: Mehriz County, Iran
- Coordinates: 31.3178°N 54.1561°E

Ernan castle (Persian: قلعه ارنان) is a historic castle located in Mehriz County, Yazd Province, Iran. It was built in the Qajar era.
