= Ziaratgah Castle =

Castle in Kerman Province, Iran

- قلعه زیارتگاه
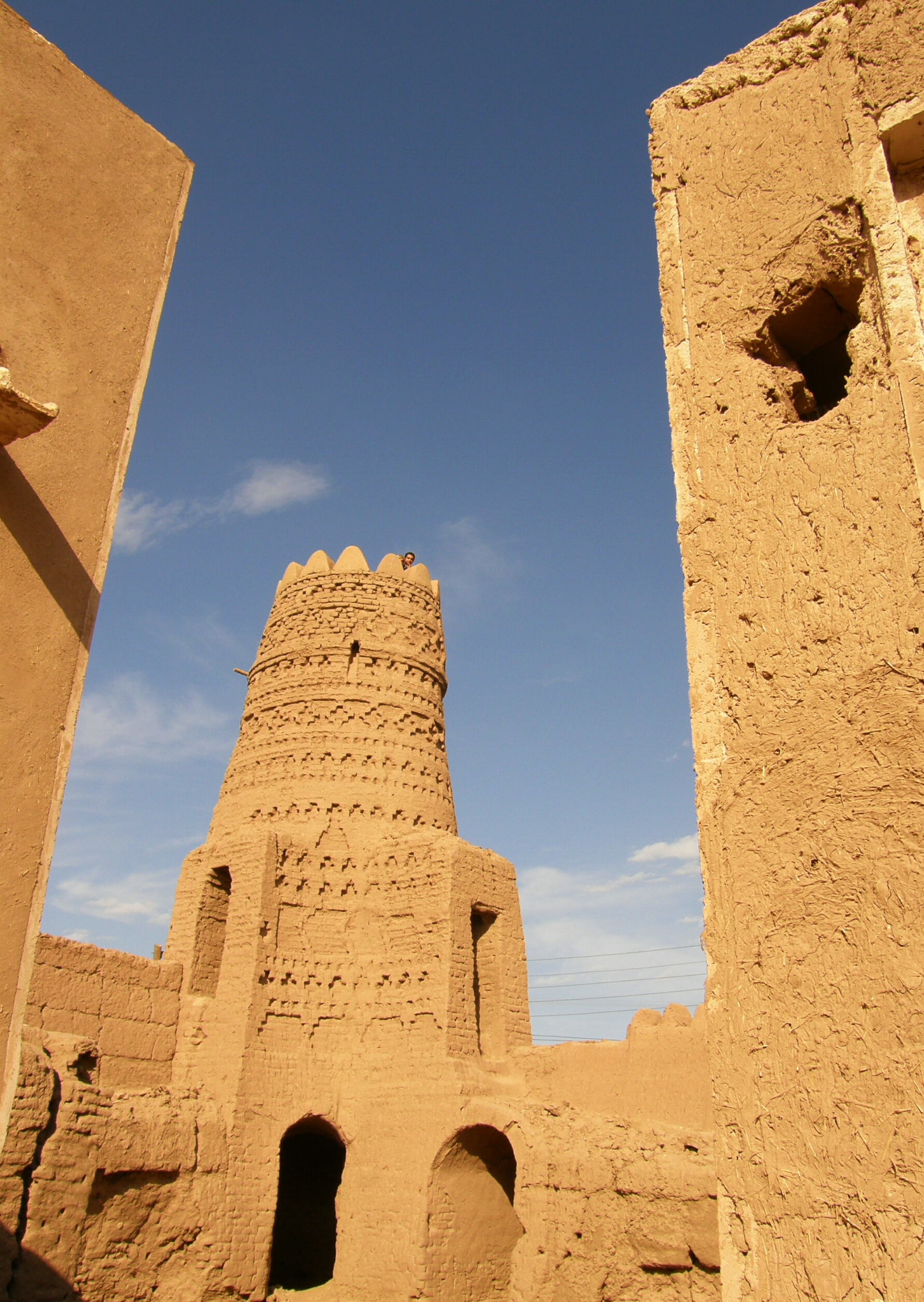

- Location within Iran

General information
- Type: Castle
- Location: Kerman County, Iran
- Coordinates: 30.53681°N 57.76517°E

Ziaratgah Castle (Persian: قلعه زیارتگاه) is a historical castle located in Kerman County in Kerman Province, The longevity of this fortress dates back to the Qajar dynasty.
