= Manujan Castle =

Castle in Kerman Province, Iran

Manujan castle
- قلعه منوجان
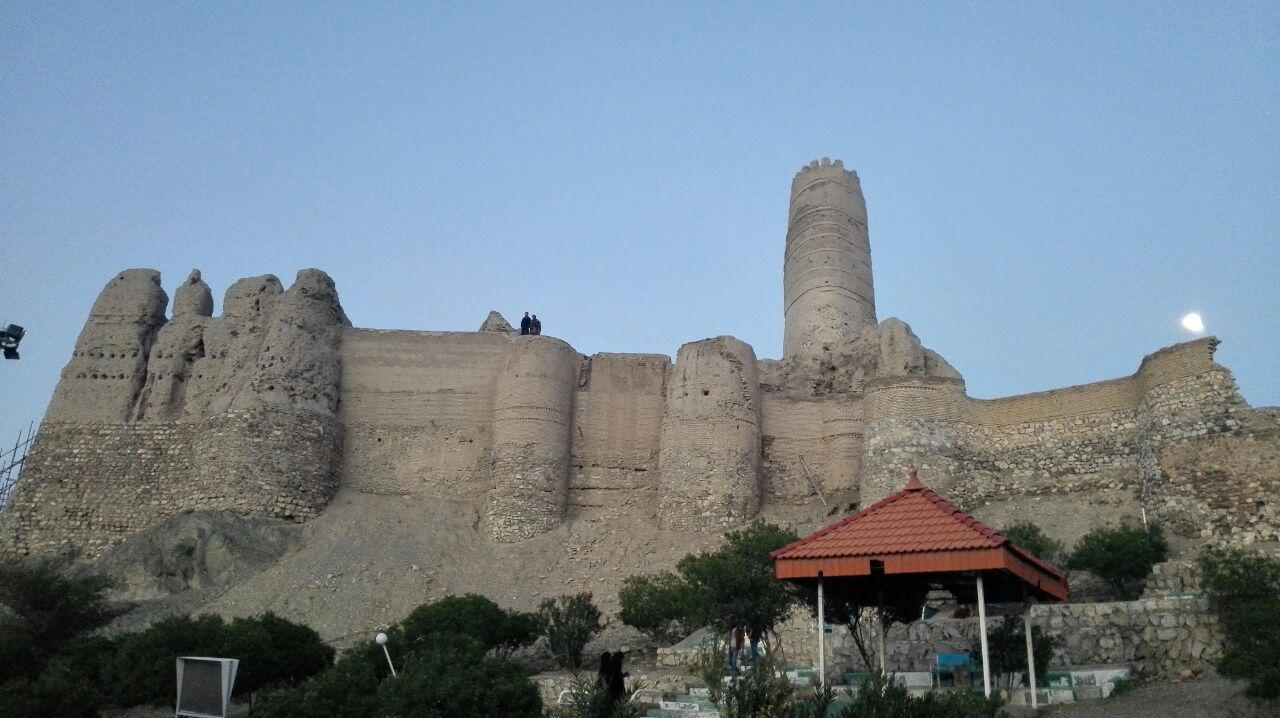

General information
- Type: Castle
- Location: Kerman Province, Iran

Manujan castle (Persian: قلعه منوجان) is a historical castle located in Kerman Province, The longevity of this fortress dates back to the Sixth century (Solar Hijri).
