= Ouvrage Plan Caval =

- Part of Maginot Line, Alpine Line
- Southeast France
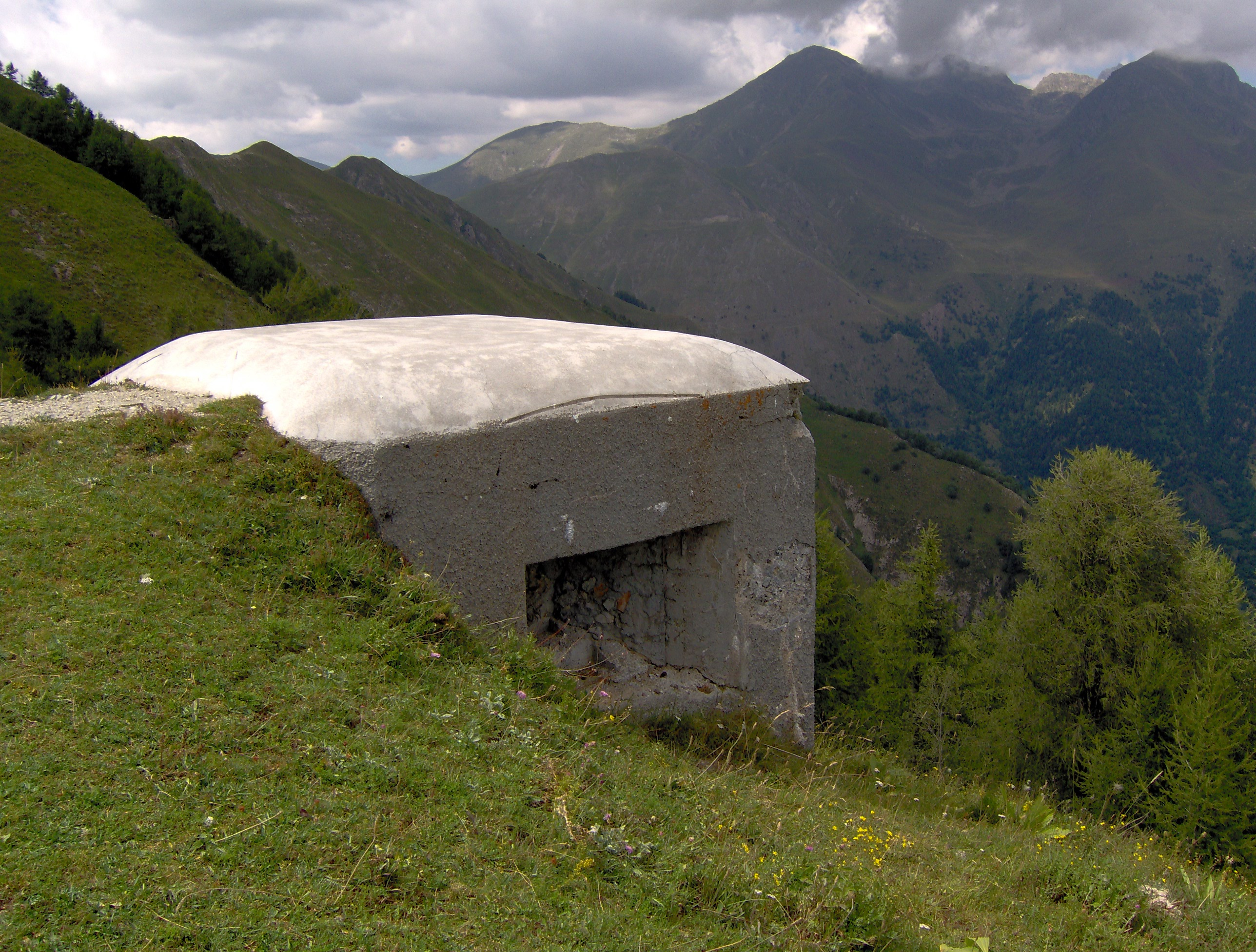
- Plan Caval

Site information
- Controlled by: France

Location
- Coordinates: 43.99726°N 7.443°E

Site history
- Built by: CORF
- In use: Abandoned
- Materials: Concrete, steel, rock excavation
- Battles/wars: Battle of France, Operation Dragoon

Ouvrage Plan Caval is a lesser work (petit ouvrage) of the Maginot Line's Alpine extension, the Alpine Line, also known as the Little Maginot Line. The ouvrage consists of two infantry blocks and one observation block facing Italy. The ouvrage is located on the heights of L'Authion, surrounded by older fortifications. Three additional blocks were planned to make it a gros ouvrage but were not built. Cost for the full ensemble was estimated at 23 million francs.

The ouvrage consists of three blocks facing Italy at an altitude of 1,870 metres (6,140 ft). The ouvrage was manned by 287 soldiers in 1940, under the command of Captain Philipp. Plan-Caval was located to control the Maglia and Cayros valleys, as well as providing flanking cover the La Béole and Saint-Véran. An extensive set of underground barracks and magazines near the uncompleted entrances was never started, so that the ouvrage as constructed consists mostly of a single narrow gallery connecting the combat blocks.

== Description ==
- Block 1 (unbuilt entry block): planned to have one observation/machine gun cloche and one twin heavy machine gun embrasure.
- Block 2 (unbuilt artillery block): planned to have one 75mm/31cal gun embrasure.
- Block 3 (partially built artillery block): planned to have one observation/machine gun cloche and one 81mm mortar turret. Neither was installed and the block is blocked off from the gallery below.
- Block 4 (infantry block): one heavy twin machine gun cloche and one twin machine gun embrasure.
- Block 5 (infantry block): one observation/machine gun cloche.
- Block 6 (infantry block): two heavy twin machine gun embrasures.

Plan Caval is also associated with a nearby casemate with one machine gun embrasure and one advance post bunker. The advanced post is a small blockhouse with three machine gun embrasures.

Other, older fortifications exist in the same neighborhood. The Batterie du Plan Caval and its associated barracks are immediately to the west of the ouvrage.

== See also ==
- List of Alpine Line ouvrages

== Bibliography ==
- Allcorn, William. The Maginot Line 1928-45. Oxford: Osprey Publishing, 2003. ISBN 1-84176-646-1
- Kaufmann, J.E. and Kaufmann, H.W. Fortress France: The Maginot Line and French Defenses in World War II, Stackpole Books, 2006. ISBN 0-275-98345-5
- Kaufmann, J.E., Kaufmann, H.W., Jancovič-Potočnik, A. and Lang, P. The Maginot Line: History and Guide, Pen and Sword, 2011. ISBN 978-1-84884-068-3
- Mary, Jean-Yves; Hohnadel, Alain; Sicard, Jacques. Hommes et Ouvrages de la Ligne Maginot, Tome 1. Paris, Histoire & Collections, 2001. ISBN 2-908182-88-2 (in French)
- Mary, Jean-Yves; Hohnadel, Alain; Sicard, Jacques. Hommes et Ouvrages de la Ligne Maginot, Tome 4 - La fortification alpine. Paris, Histoire & Collections, 2009. ISBN 978-2-915239-46-1 (in French)
- Mary, Jean-Yves; Hohnadel, Alain; Sicard, Jacques. Hommes et Ouvrages de la Ligne Maginot, Tome 5. Paris, Histoire & Collections, 2009. ISBN 978-2-35250-127-5 (in French)
