= Ouvrage Col de Garde =

Defensive structures in France

- Part of Maginot Line, Alpine Line
- near Saint-Agnès
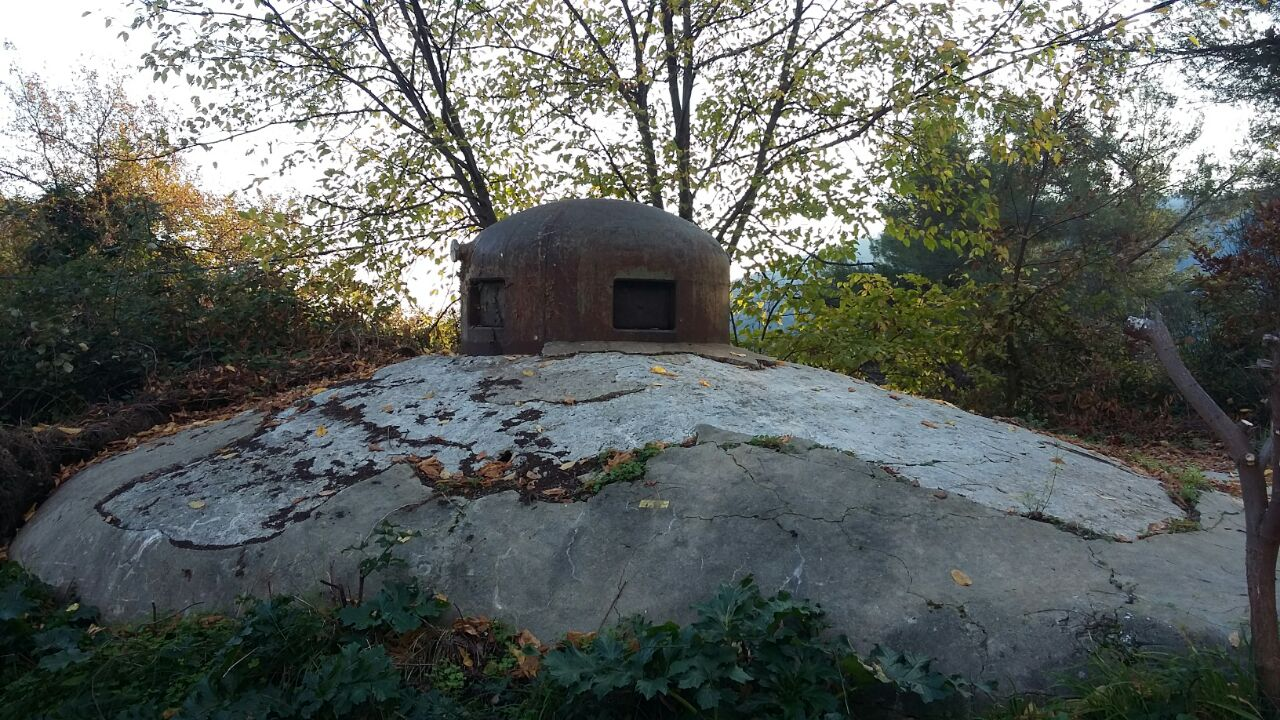

Site information
- Controlled by: France
- Open to the public: No
- Condition: Abandoned

Location
- Coordinates: 43.75659°N 7.48011°E

Site history
- Built by: CORF
- Materials: Concrete, steel, rock excavation
- Battles/wars: Italian invasion of France, Operation Dragoon

Ouvrage Col de Garde is a lesser work (petit ouvrage) of the Maginot Line's Alpine extension, the Alpine Line, also called the Little Maginot Line. The ouvrage consists of two entry blocks, one infantry block and one observation block, slightly more than 1 km south of Sainte-Agnès.

The ouvrage comprises four combat blocks at an altitude of 231 metres (758 ft), and was manned in 1940 by 115 men under the command of Lieutenant Juffet.

Col de Garde was sited to control the Col de Garde road between Saint-Agnès and Menton, as well as protecting the southern flank of the Ouvrage Sainte-Agnès. The ouvrage is closed and locked and in a good state of repair, although covered by vegetation. The position overlooks Autoroute A8 at the Col de Garde tunnel.

== Description ==
Col de Garde is a compact site with two entries and a short set of rock-cut galleries with short branches for ammunition magazines, barracks and the usine.

- Block 1 (south entry): One machine gun port.
- Block 2 (north entry): One machine gun port.
- Block 3 (observation block): one machine gun turret.
- Block 4 (infantry block): one37mm anti-tank gun port and one twin machine gun port.

== See also ==
- List of Alpine Line ouvrages

== Bibliography ==
- Allcorn, William. The Maginot Line 1928-45. Oxford: Osprey Publishing, 2003. ISBN 1-84176-646-1
- Kaufmann, J.E. and Kaufmann, H.W. Fortress France: The Maginot Line and French Defenses in World War II, Stackpole Books, 2006. ISBN 0-275-98345-5
- Kaufmann, J.E., Kaufmann, H.W., Jancovič-Potočnik, A. and Lang, P. The Maginot Line: History and Guide, Pen and Sword, 2011. ISBN 978-1-84884-068-3
- Mary, Jean-Yves; Hohnadel, Alain; Sicard, Jacques. Hommes et Ouvrages de la Ligne Maginot, Tome 1. Paris, Histoire & Collections, 2001. ISBN 2-908182-88-2 (in French)
- Mary, Jean-Yves; Hohnadel, Alain; Sicard, Jacques. Hommes et Ouvrages de la Ligne Maginot, Tome 4 - La fortification alpine. Paris, Histoire & Collections, 2009. ISBN 978-2-915239-46-1 (in French)
- Mary, Jean-Yves; Hohnadel, Alain; Sicard, Jacques. Hommes et Ouvrages de la Ligne Maginot, Tome 5. Paris, Histoire & Collections, 2009. ISBN 978-2-35250-127-5 (in French)
