= Ouvrage Col de Brouis =

- Part of Maginot Line, Alpine Line
- Southeast France

Site information
- Controlled by: France

Location
- Coordinates: 43.9241°N 7.47079°E

Site history
- Built by: CORF
- In use: Abandoned
- Materials: Concrete, steel, rock excavation
- Battles/wars: Italian invasion of France, Operation Dragoon

Ouvrage Col de Brouis is a work (gros ouvrage) of the Maginot Line's Alpine extension, the Alpine Line, also known as the Little Maginot Line. The ouvrage consists of one entry block and two artillery blocks facing Italy at an altitude of 871 metres (2,858 ft). The ouvrage is located about one kilometer north of Monte Grosso. It was placed to control the Col de Brouis and the D 2204 road between the Breil and Sospel.

== Description ==
The Y-shaped ouvrage has its ammunition magazine, barracks and usine near the entry block, with the main gallery diverging before running separately to blocks 2 and 3. Col de Brouis was built by a contractor named Borie starting in November 1931 and completed in October 1934, at a cost of 11.4 million francs. Its commander in 1940 was Captain Charvet.

- Block 1 (entry): one machine gun cloche and one machine gun embrasure.
- Block 2 (artillery): one machine gun cloche, one observation cloche, one twin machine gun cloche, one paired 47mm anti-tank gun/machine gun embrasure and one machine gun embrasure.
- Block 3 (artillery): one machine gun cloche, one observation cloche, one twin machine gun cloche and two 81mm mortar embrasures.

Two observation posts reported to Col de Brouis, including Cime du Bosc.

== History ==
Col de Brouis saw little action in 1940, but was the scene of significant combat between retreating German forces and the Allies in April 1945.

== See also ==
- List of Alpine Line ouvrages

== Bibliography ==
- Allcorn, William. The Maginot Line 1928-45. Oxford: Osprey Publishing, 2003. ISBN 1-84176-646-1
- Kaufmann, J.E. and Kaufmann, H.W. Fortress France: The Maginot Line and French Defenses in World War II, Stackpole Books, 2006. ISBN 0-275-98345-5
- Kaufmann, J.E., Kaufmann, H.W., Jancovič-Potočnik, A. and Lang, P. The Maginot Line: History and Guide, Pen and Sword, 2011. ISBN 978-1-84884-068-3
- Mary, Jean-Yves; Hohnadel, Alain; Sicard, Jacques. Hommes et Ouvrages de la Ligne Maginot, Tome 1. Paris, Histoire & Collections, 2001. ISBN 2-908182-88-2 (in French)
- Mary, Jean-Yves; Hohnadel, Alain; Sicard, Jacques. Hommes et Ouvrages de la Ligne Maginot, Tome 4 - La fortification alpine. Paris, Histoire & Collections, 2009. ISBN 978-2-915239-46-1 (in French)
- Mary, Jean-Yves; Hohnadel, Alain; Sicard, Jacques. Hommes et Ouvrages de la Ligne Maginot, Tome 5. Paris, Histoire & Collections, 2009. ISBN 978-2-35250-127-5 (in French)
