= Ouvrage Col des Banquettes =

- Part of Maginot Line, Alpine Line
- Southeast France

Site information
- Controlled by: France
- Condition: Unsecured

Location
- Coordinates: 43.81599°N 7.44615°E

Site history
- Built by: CORF
- In use: Abandoned
- Materials: Concrete, steel, rock excavation
- Battles/wars: Italian invasion of France, Operation Dragoon

Ouvrage Col des Banquettes is a lesser work (petit ouvrage) of the Maginot Line's Alpine extension, the Alpine Line, also called the "Little Maginot Line". The ouvrage consists of two entry blocks and one infantry block facing Italy at the top of the Col des Banquettes, 2 km (1.2 mi) northwest of Saint-Agnès. The position controlled the pass of the same name and was covered by Ouvrage Sainte-Agnès and the positions at Pic-de-Garuche.

== Description ==
The Ouvrage Col des Banquettes was manned in 1940 by 74 soldiers of the 86th Brigade Alpin de Forteresse (DBAF) under Lieutenant Vernet. The underground portion consists of one short gallery connecting all three blocks and a shorter parallel gallery at Block 2.

- Block 1 (entry): One machine gun embrasure.
- Block 2 (emergency exit): No armament.
- Block 3 (emergency exit): one machine gun turret and two twin machine gun embrasures.

== See also ==
- List of Alpine Line ouvrages

== Bibliography ==
- Allcorn, William. The Maginot Line 1928-45. Oxford: Osprey Publishing, 2003. ISBN 1-84176-646-1
- Kaufmann, J.E. and Kaufmann, H.W. Fortress France: The Maginot Line and French Defenses in World War II, Stackpole Books, 2006. ISBN 0-275-98345-5
- Kaufmann, J.E., Kaufmann, H.W., Jancovič-Potočnik, A. and Lang, P. The Maginot Line: History and Guide, Pen and Sword, 2011. ISBN 978-1-84884-068-3
- Mary, Jean-Yves; Hohnadel, Alain; Sicard, Jacques. Hommes et Ouvrages de la Ligne Maginot, Tome 1. Paris, Histoire & Collections, 2001. ISBN 2-908182-88-2 (in French)
- Mary, Jean-Yves; Hohnadel, Alain; Sicard, Jacques. Hommes et Ouvrages de la Ligne Maginot, Tome 4 - La fortification alpine. Paris, Histoire & Collections, 2009. ISBN 978-2-915239-46-1 (in French)
- Mary, Jean-Yves; Hohnadel, Alain; Sicard, Jacques. Hommes et Ouvrages de la Ligne Maginot, Tome 5. Paris, Histoire & Collections, 2009. ISBN 978-2-35250-127-5 (in French)
