= Ouvrage Croupe du Reservoir =

Ouvrage Croupe du Réservoir
- Part of Maginot Line, Alpine Line
- Roquebrune

Site information
- Controlled by: France
- Open to the public: No
- Condition: Occupied

Location
- Coordinates: 43.76439°N 7.45612°E

Site history
- Materials: Concrete, steel, rock excavation
- Battles/wars: Italian invasion of France, Operation Dragoon

Ouvrage Croupe du Réservoir is a lesser work (petit ouvrage) of the Maginot Line's Alpine extension, the Alpine Line. Located on the heights of Roquebrune at an elevation of 139 meters, the ouvrage consists of one entry block and one observation block facing Italy and covering the Grande Corniche road. The fortification was manned by 60 troops of the 58th Demi-Brigade Alpin de Forteresse (DBAF) under the command of sous-lieutenant Roman.

== Description ==
Croupe-du-Réservoir is located in a hill above Ouvrage Cap Martin, positioned to prevent infiltration along the corniche road. Two blocks are connected by a gallery with short side passages.

- Block 1 (entry): One machine gun port and one grenade launcher port.
- Block 2 (infantry): One machine gun cloche. There were no other ports or firing positions.

The ouvrage is privately occupied and has been kept in an excellent state of preservation.

== See also ==
- List of Alpine Line ouvrages

== Bibliography ==
- Allcorn, William. The Maginot Line 1928-45. Oxford: Osprey Publishing, 2003. ISBN 1-84176-646-1
- Kaufmann, J.E. and Kaufmann, H.W. Fortress France: The Maginot Line and French Defenses in World War II, Stackpole Books, 2006. ISBN 0-275-98345-5
- Kaufmann, J.E., Kaufmann, H.W., Jancovič-Potočnik, A. and Lang, P. The Maginot Line: History and Guide, Pen and Sword, 2011. ISBN 978-1-84884-068-3
- Mary, Jean-Yves; Hohnadel, Alain; Sicard, Jacques. Hommes et Ouvrages de la Ligne Maginot, Tome 1. Paris, Histoire & Collections, 2001. ISBN 2-908182-88-2 (in French)
- Mary, Jean-Yves; Hohnadel, Alain; Sicard, Jacques. Hommes et Ouvrages de la Ligne Maginot, Tome 4 - La fortification alpine. Paris, Histoire & Collections, 2009. ISBN 978-2-915239-46-1 (in French)
- Mary, Jean-Yves; Hohnadel, Alain; Sicard, Jacques. Hommes et Ouvrages de la Ligne Maginot, Tome 5. Paris, Histoire & Collections, 2009. ISBN 978-2-35250-127-5 (in French)
