= Ouvrage Col de la Valette =

- Part of Maginot Line, Alpine Line
- Southeast France

Site information
- Controlled by: France

Location
- Coordinates: 44.1559°N 7.0589°E

Site history
- Built by: CORF/MOM
- In use: Abandoned
- Materials: Concrete, steel, rock excavation
- Battles/wars: Italian invasion of France, Operation Dragoon

Ouvrage Col de la Valette is a lesser work (petit ouvrage) of the Maginot Line's Alpine extension, the Alpine Line. The ouvrage is located at an altitude of 2,182 metres (7,159 ft). Apart from a portion of Block 3 and the bare gallery system, little was completed. The post overlooks the valley of the Tinée at Isola on one side, and Beuil on the other.

== Description ==
- Block 1 (not built): west entry.
- Block 2 (not built): east entry.
- Block 3 (incomplete): observation block with a VDP cloche (not installed).
- Block 4 (not built): infantry casemate with two twin machine gun embrasures.

=== AP Isola ===
The advanced post at Isola, in the valley below Col de la Valette, was built by MOM (Main d’Œuvre Militaire), which built many of the lesser posts. Built in 1931, Isola consisted of four blocks: a north entrance with one machine gun, an emergency exit, a machine gun casemate and an observation block with an AP cloche. The post was manned by 5 non-commissioned officers and 27 men. A small gallery system connected the blocks and provided shelter. The post is located in the bank of the Tinée just south of Isola at an altitude of 896 metres (2,940 ft)

== See also ==
- List of Alpine Line ouvrages

== Bibliography ==
- Allcorn, William (2003). The Maginot Line, 1928-45. Oxford: Osprey Publishing. ISBN 978-1-84176-646-1.
- Kaufmann, J. E.; Kaufmann, H. W.; Idzikowski, Tomasz (2006). Fortress France: The Maginot Line and French Defenses in World War II. Stackpole Books. ISBN 978-0-275-98345-1.
- Kaufmann, J. E.; Kaufmann, H. W.; Jancovič-Potočnik, Aleksander; Lang, Patrice (2011). The Maginot Line: History and Guide. South Yorkshire: Pen & Sword. ISBN 978-1-84884-068-3.
- Mary, Jean-Yves; Hohnadel, Alain; Sicard, Jacques (2001). Hommes et ouvrages de la Ligne Maginot (in French). Vol. Tome 1. Paris: Histoire & Collections. ISBN 2-908182-88-2.
- Mary, Jean-Yves; Hohnadel, Alain; Sicard, Jacques (2009). Hommes et ouvrages de la Ligne Maginot (in French). Vol. Tome 4. Paris: Histoire & Collections. ISBN 978-2-915239-46-1.
- Mary, Jean-Yves; Hohnadel, Alain; Sicard, Jacques (2010). Hommes et ouvrages de la Ligne Maginot (in French). Vol. Tome 5. Paris: Histoire & Collections. ISBN 978-2-35250-127-5.
