= Ouvrage Saint Ours Nord-est =

- Part of Maginot Line, Alpine Line
- Southeast France

Site information
- Controlled by: France

Site history
- Built by: CORF
- In use: Abandoned
- Materials: Concrete, steel, rock excavation
- Battles/wars: Italian invasion of France

Garrison information
- Garrison: 57

Ouvrage Saint Ours Nord-est is a lesser work (petit ouvrage) of the Maginot Line's Alpine extension, the Alpine Line. The ouvrage consists of two infantry blocks. The associated underground support galleries are arranged with a short gallery connecting Blocks 1 and 2, with parallel stubs at Block 2. While it is listed in some sources as an ouvrage owing to its construction by CORF, it is more like an infantry abri or shelter.

== Description ==
See Fortified Sector of the Dauphiné for a broader discussion of the Dauphiné sector of the Alpine Line.

- Block 1 (north entry): one machine gun cloche and one machine gun embrasure.
- Block 2 (south entry): one machine gun embrasure.

== See also ==
- List of Alpine Line ouvrages

== Bibliography ==
- Allcorn, William. The Maginot Line 1928-45. Oxford: Osprey Publishing, 2003. ISBN 1-84176-646-1
- Kaufmann, J.E. and Kaufmann, H.W. Fortress France: The Maginot Line and French Defenses in World War II, Stackpole Books, 2006. ISBN 0-275-98345-5
- Kaufmann, J.E., Kaufmann, H.W., Jancovič-Potočnik, A. and Lang, P. The Maginot Line: History and Guide, Pen and Sword, 2011. ISBN 978-1-84884-068-3
- Mary, Jean-Yves; Hohnadel, Alain; Sicard, Jacques. Hommes et Ouvrages de la Ligne Maginot, Tome 1. Paris, Histoire & Collections, 2001. ISBN 2-908182-88-2 (in French)
- Mary, Jean-Yves; Hohnadel, Alain; Sicard, Jacques. Hommes et Ouvrages de la Ligne Maginot, Tome 4 - La fortification alpine. Paris, Histoire & Collections, 2009. ISBN 978-2-915239-46-1 (in French)
- Mary, Jean-Yves; Hohnadel, Alain; Sicard, Jacques. Hommes et Ouvrages de la Ligne Maginot, Tome 5. Paris, Histoire & Collections, 2009. ISBN 978-2-35250-127-5 (in French)
