= Ouvrage Les Rochilles =

- Part of Maginot Line, Alpine Line
- Southeast France
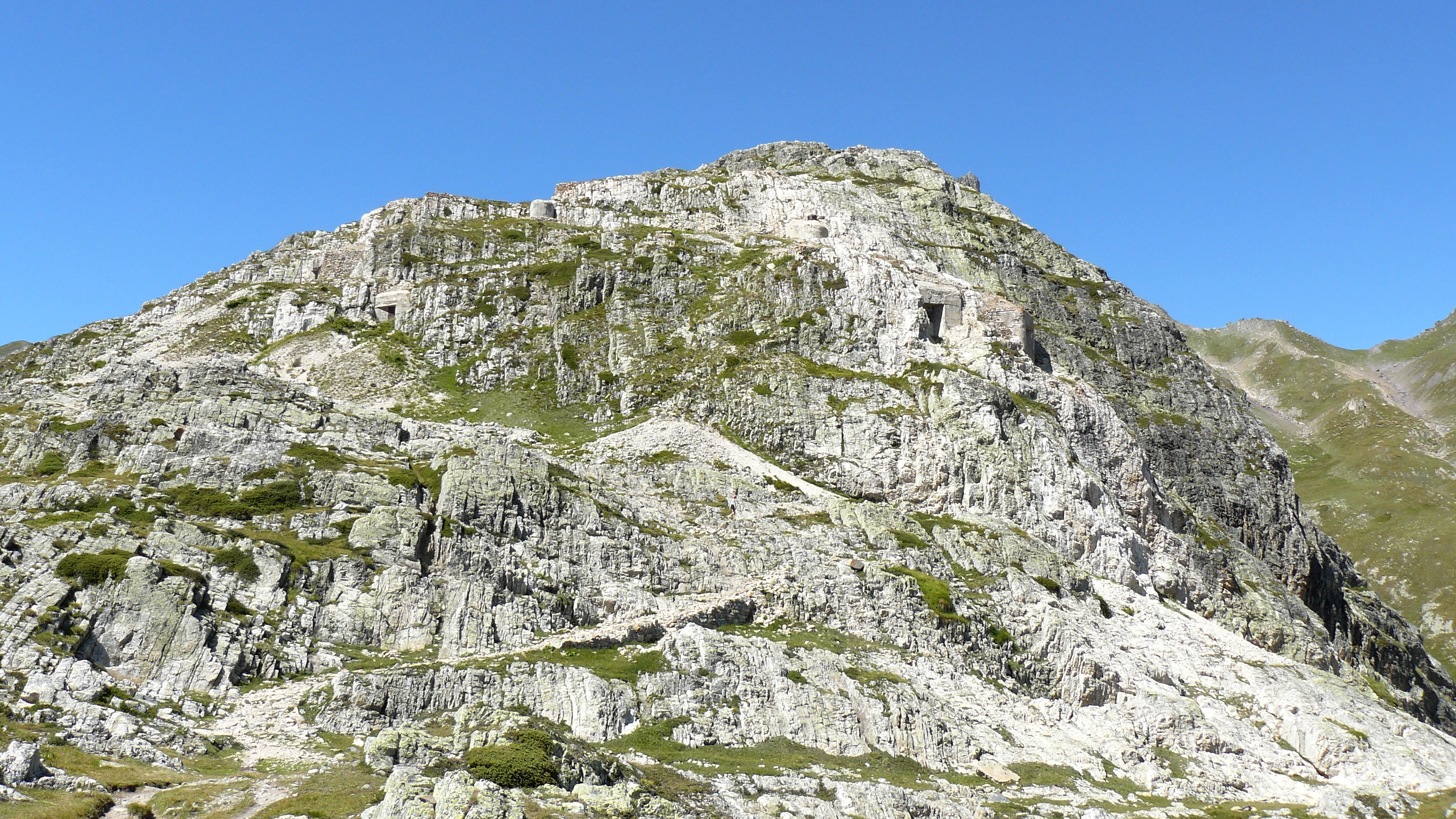

Site information
- Controlled by: France

Location
- Coordinates: 45.08525°N 6.4698°E

Site history
- Built by: MOM
- In use: Abandoned
- Materials: Concrete, steel, rock excavation
- Battles/wars: Battle of France

Ouvrage Les Rochilles is a lesser work (petit ouvrage) of the Maginot Line's Alpine extension, the Alpine Line, in the high Alps about 20 kilometres (12 mi) southwest of Modane. The ouvrage consists of one entry block, two infantry blocks and one observation block. Unusually, it was built by the Main d'Oeuvre Militaire (MOM), rather than CORF (Commission pour l'Organisation des Régions Fortifiées), which built most of the larger positions. The design was by CORF.

Work began in 1811, but was not completed by 1940, when it was commanded by Lieutenant Curbaille.

== Description ==
- Block 1 (observation): One observation cloche
- Block 2 (infantry): one heavy twin machine gun embrasures covering the Col du Fréjus.
- Block 3 (infantry): one heavy twin machine gun embrasures covering the Col du Fréjus.
- Entry: one machine gun embrasure.
- Emergency exit: one machine gun embrasure.

The Camp des Rochilles is located nearby. Constructed 1902–1907, it is at an altitude of 2,420 metres (7,940 ft). The barracks complex was connected to Plan-Lachat by an aerial tram. The advanced post of Aiguille Noire is a short distance to the south, with four machine gun embrasures.

Les Rochilles saw no significant action in 1940 or 1944.

== See also ==
- List of Alpine Line ouvrages

== Bibliography ==
- Allcorn, William. The Maginot Line 1928-45. Oxford: Osprey Publishing, 2003. ISBN 1-84176-646-1
- Kaufmann, J.E. and Kaufmann, H.W. Fortress France: The Maginot Line and French Defenses in World War II, Stackpole Books, 2006. ISBN 0-275-98345-5
- Kaufmann, J.E., Kaufmann, H.W., Jancovič-Potočnik, A. and Lang, P. The Maginot Line: History and Guide, Pen and Sword, 2011. ISBN 978-1-84884-068-3
- Mary, Jean-Yves; Hohnadel, Alain; Sicard, Jacques. Hommes et Ouvrages de la Ligne Maginot, Tome 1. Paris, Histoire & Collections, 2001. ISBN 2-908182-88-2 (in French)
- Mary, Jean-Yves; Hohnadel, Alain; Sicard, Jacques. Hommes et Ouvrages de la Ligne Maginot, Tome 4 - La fortification alpine. Paris, Histoire & Collections, 2009. ISBN 978-2-915239-46-1 (in French)
- Mary, Jean-Yves; Hohnadel, Alain; Sicard, Jacques. Hommes et Ouvrages de la Ligne Maginot, Tome 5. Paris, Histoire & Collections, 2009. ISBN 978-2-35250-127-5 (in French)
