= Ouvrage Col du Caire Gros =

- Part of Maginot Line, Alpine Line
- Southeast France

Site information
- Controlled by: France

Location
- Coordinates: 44.04596°N 7.20773°E

Site history
- Built by: CORF/MOM
- In use: Abandoned
- Materials: Concrete, steel, rock excavation
- Battles/wars: Italian invasion of France, Operation Dragoon

Garrison information
- Garrison: 64

Ouvrage Col du Caire Gros is a lesser work (petit ouvrage) of the Maginot Line's Alpine extension, the Alpine Line. The ouvrage consists of two entry blocks at an altitude of 2,048 metres (6,719 ft). Additional blocks were planned but not built.

== Description ==
- Block 1 (west entry): unarmed, protected by Block 2.
- Block 2 (infantry): one machine gun embrasure, protects Block 1.
- Block 3 (not completed): one observation cloche planned.
- Block 4 (unbuilt): one machine gun embrasure and one twin heavy machine gun embrasure planned.

The ouvrage blocks access to the Col du Caire Gros from the north.

== See also ==
- List of Alpine Line ouvrages

== Bibliography ==
- Allcorn, William. The Maginot Line 1928-45. Oxford: Osprey Publishing, 2003. ISBN 1-84176-646-1
- Kaufmann, J.E. and Kaufmann, H.W. Fortress France: The Maginot Line and French Defenses in World War II, Stackpole Books, 2006. ISBN 0-275-98345-5
- Kaufmann, J.E., Kaufmann, H.W., Jancovič-Potočnik, A. and Lang, P. The Maginot Line: History and Guide, Pen and Sword, 2011. ISBN 978-1-84884-068-3
- Mary, Jean-Yves; Hohnadel, Alain; Sicard, Jacques. Hommes et Ouvrages de la Ligne Maginot, Tome 1. Paris, Histoire & Collections, 2001. ISBN 2-908182-88-2 (in French)
- Mary, Jean-Yves; Hohnadel, Alain; Sicard, Jacques. Hommes et Ouvrages de la Ligne Maginot, Tome 4 - La fortification alpine. Paris, Histoire & Collections, 2009. ISBN 978-2-915239-46-1 (in French)
- Mary, Jean-Yves; Hohnadel, Alain; Sicard, Jacques. Hommes et Ouvrages de la Ligne Maginot, Tome 5. Paris, Histoire & Collections, 2009. ISBN 978-2-35250-127-5 (in French)
