= Ouvrage Cap Martin =

Fortification in France

- Part of Maginot Line, Alpine Line
- Menton and Roquebrune
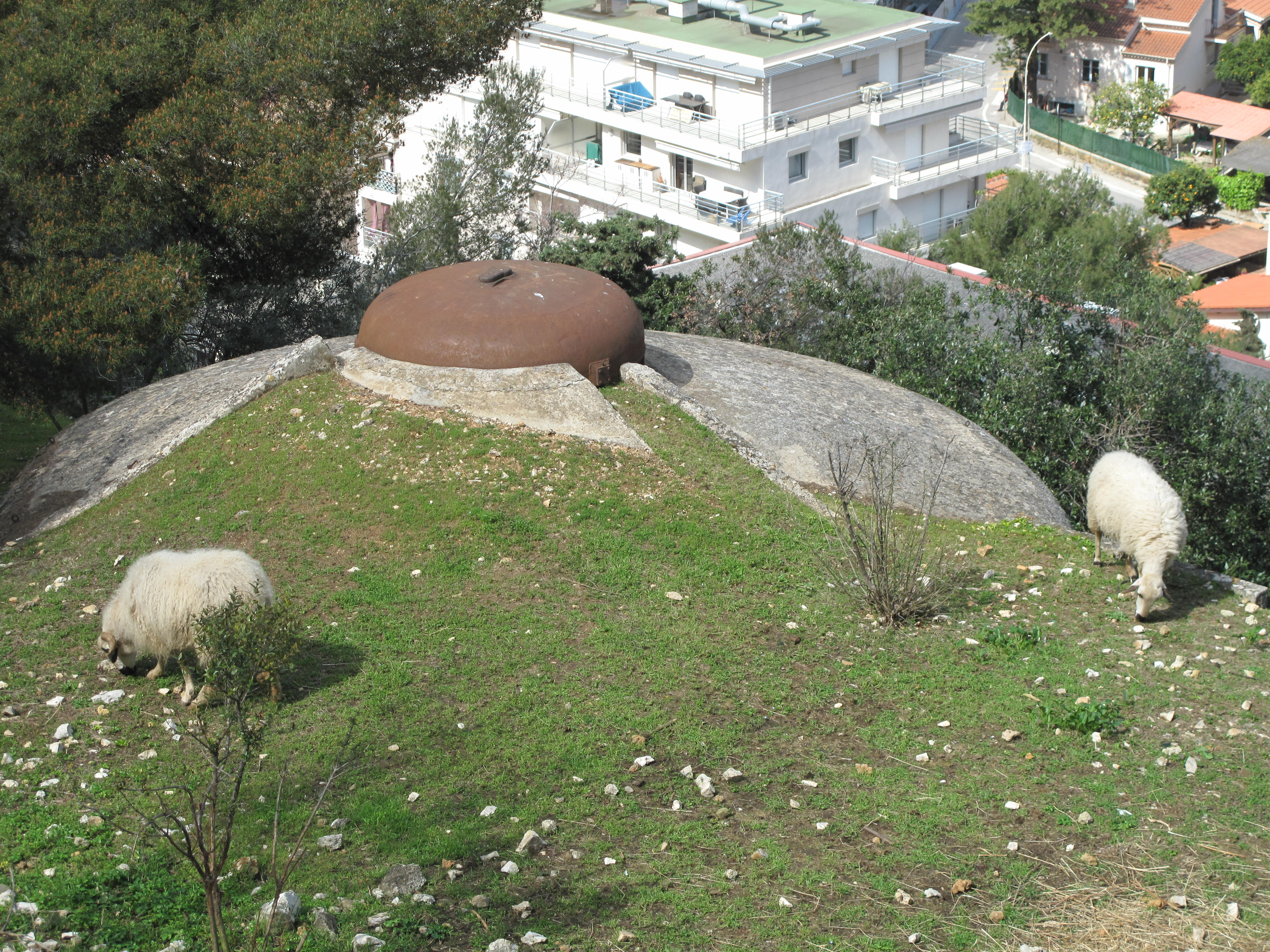
- Top of Cap-Martin

Site information
- Controlled by: France
- Open to the public: Yes
- Condition: Preserved

Location
- Coordinates: 43.755833°N 7.480833°E

Site history
- Built: 1930
- Built by: CORF
- Materials: Concrete, steel, rock excavation
- Battles/wars: Italian invasion of France, Operation Dragoon, Second Battle of the Alps

Ouvrage Cap Martin is a work (gros ouvrage) of the Maginot Line's Alpine extension, the Alpine Line, also called the Little Maginot Line. The ouvrage, located on high ground in Roquebrune, consists of two artillery blocks and one combination block facing Italy. The ouvrage was at the southernmost end of the Alpine Line and overlooked the Mediterranean Sea coastline at an altitude of 21 meters between Nice and Menton, facing towards Italy. The ouvrage and its advance casemate at Pont Saint Louis controlled the coastal roads along the Mediterranean.

== Description ==
The ouvrage was built between October 1930 and October 1933 by a contractor named Borie, at a cost of 17 million francs, of which 1.6 million francs were for property acquisition and 2,776,000 francs were for the fort's armament. Three observatories reported to Cap Martin.

- Block 1 (entry): one FM embrasure, two machine gun cloches, one grenade launcher cloche, two 81mm mortars
- Block 2: (bloc de barrage) one 75mm gun, two twin machine guns and one observation cloche. Block 2 covered the plain of Menton and supported the casemate at Pont Saint Louis. The block was damaged during the German retreat in 1944.
- Block 3: (flanking block) two 75mm guns, 2 81mm mortars, 2 machine gun cloches. Block 3 covered the area between Cap Martin and Ouvrage Roquebrunne.

The fort is unusual for Alpine Line fortifications in possessing a circulation gallery some distance below the entrance and combat blocks, rising via steps and hoists to each block. This feature is more typical of the main Maginot Line in the northeast of France. The gallery was served by a network of railways of 60 cm gauge, pushed by the men. In the case of Cap Martin, the wagons were of a unique design.

Three observation posts are attached to Cap Martin, including the Observatoire du Cimitière de Roquebrune and the Abri Nord de Mont-Gros de Roquebrune.

== History ==
Cap Martin was garrisoned by the 96th Brigade Alpin de Forteresse (BAF), supported by the 157th Régiment d'Artillerie de Position (RAP). The garrison comprised 343 men and 11 officers, commanded by Captain Jacques Hugard and Captain Paris. Cap Martin fired the first shots of the Italian confrontation on 14 June 1940, eight shots at the Pont-Saint-Louis bridge. The first overt Italian action took place on 20 June, when the Italians of the Cosseria Division attempted a frontal assault on the avant-post at Pont-Saint-Louis. Cap Martin opened fire, supported by Saint-Agnès and Mont Agel. On 21 June 1940 Italian artillery bombarded Cap Martin with 149mm and 210mm shells. The next day saw aerial bombing attacks on Cap Martin. An armored train attempting to enter French territory on the coastal line was fired upon by Mont Agel and damaged. Heavy Italian artillery fire damaged Cap Martin's 75mm gun in Block 2. A rumored Italian infantry attack prompted heavy French fire, but failed to materialize. On 24 June two armored trains, one with 120mm guns and another with 152mm guns, fired on Cap Martin in support of Italian troops advancing through Menton. The Italians occupied the surface of the fortification until they were fired upon by other French artillery and were forced to retreat. The Pont-Saint-Louis position forced the Italians to go around through a railroad tunnel, was relieved by French forces in the evening. The armistice of 25 June brought combat to a close.

On 15 August 1944 Allied forces landed on the French Riviera in Operation Dragoon. Retreating German troops blew up Cap Martin's Block 3 to prevent it from firing on their rear. The end of the war found Cap Martin's Blocks 2 and 3 heavily damaged. Because of the perceived threat of a Soviet invasion through northern Italy, the blocks were repaired by the early 1950s. Through the 1960s, interest and funding for the Maginot works declined, and Cap Martin was eventually sold.

== Casemate du Pont Saint Louis ==
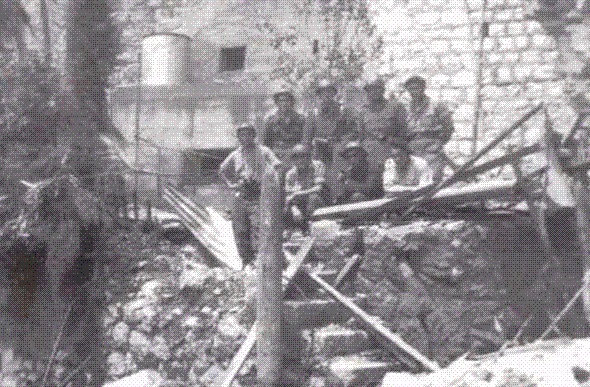
Crew of the casemate, 1940

The Casemate du Pont Saint Louis was an advanced defensive work supported by Cap Martin and manned by the 96th BAF. It was the only fortification directly on the seacoast, located at the frontier between France and Italy, and was intended to block any advance along the coastal road. The CORF-designed post was equipped with a rolling anti-tank barrier, a 37mm anti-tank gun, and two twin machine guns.

The anti-tank gate was a rolling barrier which slid from a slot in a fortified concrete housing along the side of the road, forming a barrier some meters from the post's blockhouse. The road and post occupied a narrow shelf between a cliff and a steep slope to the sea. The gate housing included two small arms ports, while the blockhouse could cover the gate and the road beyond with its guns firing through embrasures in the heavy concrete guardpost. Tunnels in the cliff wall behind the post contained a magazine, living quarters, and an escape tunnel, like a Maginot ouvrage on a much smaller scale.

== Status ==
The Casemate Pont Saint Louis was opened for public visits by the Association AMICORF in 1995. The main ouvrage was restored beginning in 1997 and was opened to the public in February 2008. Both Cap Martin and the Pont Saint Louis post are open during summer months.

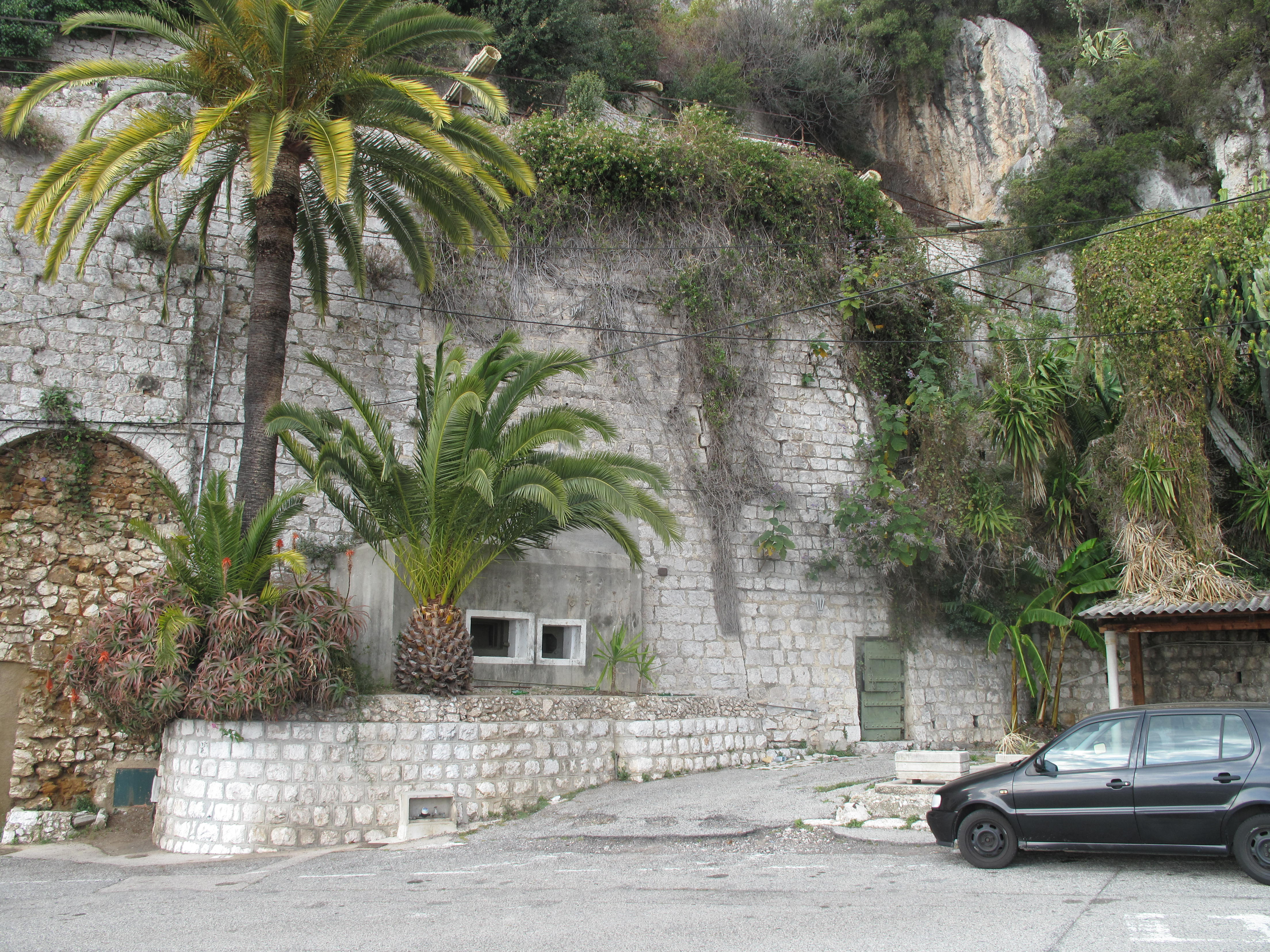
Pont Saint-Louis casemate

== See also ==
- List of Alpine Line ouvrages

== Bibliography ==
- Allcorn, William. The Maginot Line 1928-45. Oxford: Osprey Publishing, 2003. ISBN 1-84176-646-1
- Kaufmann, J.E. and Kaufmann, H.W. Fortress France: The Maginot Line and French Defenses in World War II, Stackpole Books, 2006. ISBN 0-275-98345-5
- Kaufmann, J.E., Kaufmann, H.W., Jancovič-Potočnik, A. and Lang, P. The Maginot Line: History and Guide, Pen and Sword, 2011. ISBN 978-1-84884-068-3
- Mary, Jean-Yves; Hohnadel, Alain; Sicard, Jacques. Hommes et Ouvrages de la Ligne Maginot, Tome 1. Paris, Histoire & Collections, 2001. ISBN 2-908182-88-2 (in French)
- Mary, Jean-Yves; Hohnadel, Alain; Sicard, Jacques. Hommes et Ouvrages de la Ligne Maginot, Tome 4 - La fortification alpine. Paris, Histoire & Collections, 2009. ISBN 978-2-915239-46-1 (in French)
- Mary, Jean-Yves; Hohnadel, Alain; Sicard, Jacques. Hommes et Ouvrages de la Ligne Maginot, Tome 5. Paris, Histoire & Collections, 2009. ISBN 978-2-35250-127-5 (in French)
