= Ouvrage Saint-Roch =

- Part of Maginot Line, Alpine Line
- Southeast France
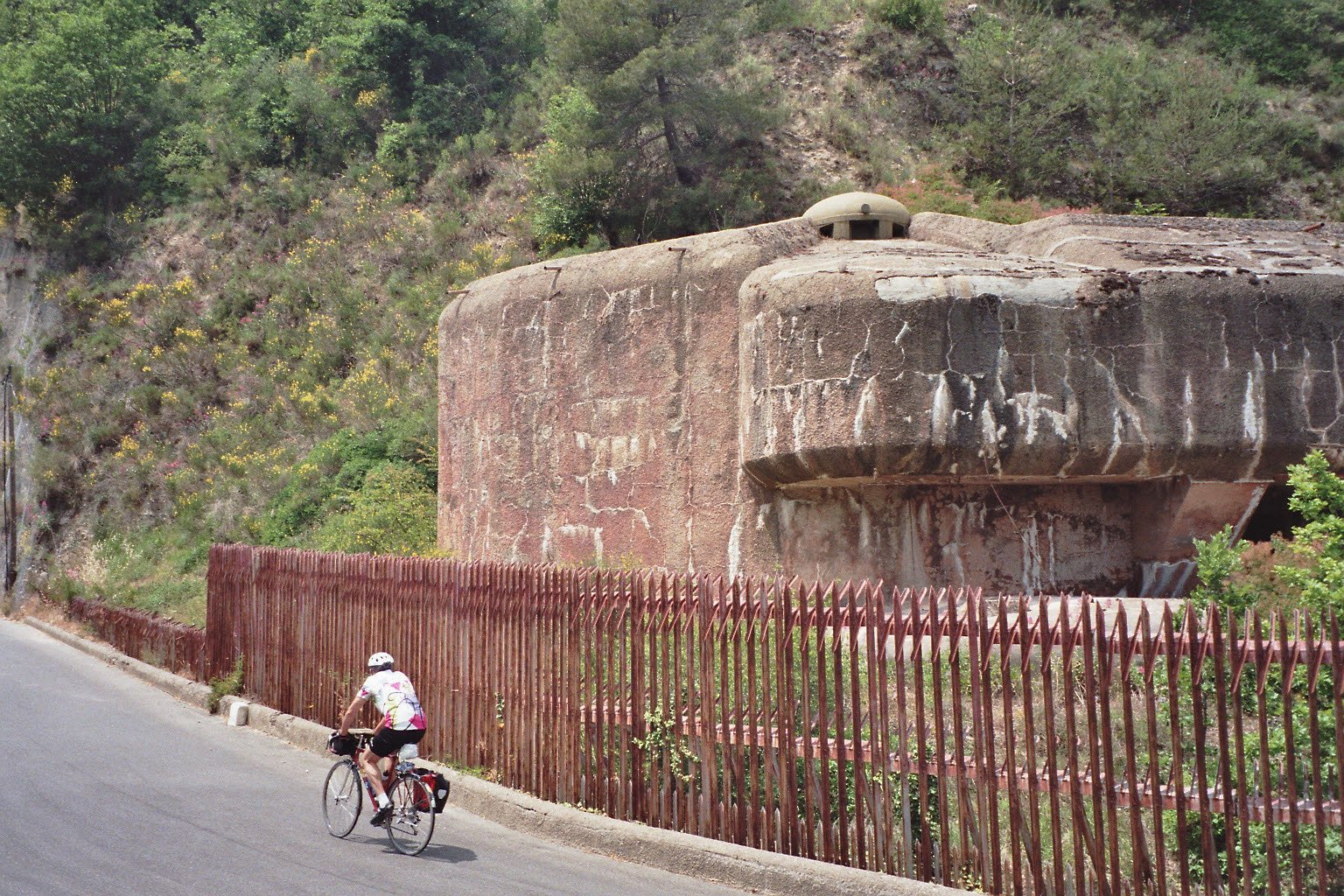
- Saint-Roch, Block 4

Site information
- Controlled by: France
- Open to the public: Yes
- Condition: Preserved

Location
- Coordinates: 43.8745°N 7.44377°E

Site history
- Built by: CORF
- Materials: Concrete, steel, rock excavation
- Battles/wars: Italian invasion of France, Operation Dragoon

Ouvrage Saint-Roch is a work (gros ouvrage) of the Maginot Line's Alpine extension, the Alpine Line, also known as the Little Maginot Line. Small for a gros ouvrages, the ouvrage consists of one entry block, one artillery block and two observation blocks overlooking Sospel at an altitude of 426 metres (1,398 ft). The position is located just to the southwest of Sospel, its entrance block in a narrow valley and the artillery block on the other side of the ridge overlooking Sospel. The ouvrage is laid out along a single line, with the entry block to the rear, immediately followed by the usine, with barracks farther along and Blocks 2 and 3 at intervals. The position's main armament is concentrated in Block 4, a massive blockhouse designed to protect against rockfalls from higher up the mountain.

== Description ==
Ouvrage Saint-Roch was built between November 1930 and June 1932, starting with a contractor named Marting and finishing with Roussel. The cost was 12.7 million francs, of which the armament cost 2,128,000 francs

- Block 1 (entry): one machine gun cloche and two machine gun embrasures.
- Block 2 (observation): one machine gun/observation cloche.
- Block 3 (infantry): one machine gun cloche and one grenade launcher cloche.
- Block 4 (artillery): three twin machine gun cloches, two twin machine gun embrasures, one 75mm/29cal gun embrasure, and four 81mm mortar embrasures.

A fifth block on the crest of the mountain was proposed but not built, to house a GFM cloche. Two observation posts were associated with Saint-Roch, including Campoast, armed with one machine gun and twin automatic rifle positions.

Saint-Roch and an associated museum are open for visitation year-round. The facilities are operated by the Association de l'Armée des Alpes,

== See also ==
- List of Alpine Line ouvrages

== Bibliography ==
- Allcorn, William. The Maginot Line 1928-45. Oxford: Osprey Publishing, 2003. ISBN 1-84176-646-1
- Kaufmann, J.E. and Kaufmann, H.W. Fortress France: The Maginot Line and French Defenses in World War II, Stackpole Books, 2006. ISBN 0-275-98345-5
- Kaufmann, J.E., Kaufmann, H.W., Jancovič-Potočnik, A. and Lang, P. The Maginot Line: History and Guide, Pen and Sword, 2011. ISBN 978-1-84884-068-3
- Mary, Jean-Yves; Hohnadel, Alain; Sicard, Jacques. Hommes et Ouvrages de la Ligne Maginot, Tome 1. Paris, Histoire & Collections, 2001. ISBN 2-908182-88-2 (in French)
- Mary, Jean-Yves; Hohnadel, Alain; Sicard, Jacques. Hommes et Ouvrages de la Ligne Maginot, Tome 4 - La fortification alpine. Paris, Histoire & Collections, 2009. ISBN 978-2-915239-46-1 (in French)
- Mary, Jean-Yves; Hohnadel, Alain; Sicard, Jacques. Hommes et Ouvrages de la Ligne Maginot, Tome 5. Paris, Histoire & Collections, 2009. ISBN 978-2-35250-127-5 (in French)
