= Abri du Ancien Camp =

- Part of Maginot Line, Alpine Line
- Southeast France

Site information
- Controlled by: France

Site history
- Built by: MOM
- In use: Abandoned
- Materials: Concrete, steel, rock excavation
- Battles/wars: Battle of France

Ancien Camp is an abri or infantry shelter associated with the Maginot Line's Alpine extension, the Alpine Line. The position consists of two entry blocks. Neither block was armed. One machine gun cloche and embrasures for a heavy twin machine gun and a light machine gun were built, but not equipped. The blocks are connected by a single large underground gallery.

== See also ==
- List of Alpine Line ouvrages

== Bibliography ==
- Allcorn, William. The Maginot Line 1928-45. Oxford: Osprey Publishing, 2003. ISBN 1-84176-646-1
- Kauffmann, J.E. and Kaufmann, H.W. Fortress France: The Maginot Line and French Defenses in World War II, 2006. ISBN 0-275-98345-5
- Mary, Jean-Yves; Hohnadel, Alain; Sicard, Jacques. Hommes et Ouvrages de la Ligne Maginot, Tome 4 - La fortification alpine. Paris, Histoire & Collections, 2009. ISBN 978-2-915239-46-1 (in French)
- Mary, Jean-Yves; Hohnadel, Alain; Sicard, Jacques. Hommes et Ouvrages de la Ligne Maginot, Tome 5. Paris, Histoire & Collections, 2009. ISBN 978-2-35250-127-5 (in French)
