= Ouvrage Mont Agel =

- Part of Maginot Line, Alpine Line
- near Nice

Site information
- Controlled by: France
- Open to the public: No
- Condition: Occupied

Location
- Coordinates: 43°46′16.56″N 7°25′12.29″E

Site history
- Built: 1930
- Built by: CORF
- Materials: Concrete, steel, rock excavation
- Battles/wars: Italian invasion of France, Operation Dragoon

Garrison information
- Occupants: French Air Force

Ouvrage Mont Agel is a work (gros ouvrage) of the Maginot Line's Alpine extension, the Alpine Line, also called the Little Maginot Line. The 1930s ouvrage was built in and around the earlier mountaintop Fortress of Mont Agel. The ouvrage forms a backup to the main curtain of Alpine Line forts, and was not initially planned as part of the Alpine Line proper. Its intended function was primarily to provide heavy, long-range artillery support from a location well to the rear of the line. However, the planned 145mm heavy guns were never installed. Its site on Mont Agel, at an altitude of 1,118 metres (3,668 ft), is the highest point in the vicinity of Nice and Menton and commands the entire coastline, as well as the approaches from Sospel to the north. The site is now occupied by Base Aérienne 943 of the French Air Force and functions as an air defense control station.

== Description ==
The ouvrage consists of three entry blocks (including a terminal for an aerial tram) with a guard block, one infantry block, two artillery blocks and one observation block facing Italy. The mountaintop position is unusual in having two 75 mm gun turrets: due to restricted fields of fire, most Alpine ouvrages had their guns in casemates. Mont Agel, with its commanding site, could make appropriate use of turreted guns. A 145 mm gun turret was planned, but not built.

- Block 1 (personnel entry): no armament.
- Block 2 (materials entry): no armament.
- Block 3 (aerial tram entry): no armament.
- Block 4 (entry guard block): two machine gun ports and one machine gun turret, intended to defend the three entry points in Blocks 1–3.
- Block 5 (artillery turret block): two 75mm/1933 guns in one retractable turret.
- Block 6 (artillery turret block): two 75mm/1933 guns in one retractable turret.
- Block 7 (infantry block): one machine gun/observation turret.
- Block 8 (observation block, Observatiore Est de Mont-Agel): one machine gun port, one machine gun turret and one machine gun/observation turret. Block 8 is not connected to the rest of the complex by a gallery.

The Maginot blocks are concentrated in a relatively small area on the west side of the summit plateau, to the north of the Séré de Rivières reduit. They are not used by the French Air Force installation.

=== Observation posts ===
The observatory Mont-Gros de Roquebrune 43°45′58″N 7°26′35″E is an observation block intended to spot the fall of shot for Ouvrage Mont Agel. Located near Roquebrune, the post is at a lower altitude and closer to the sea than Mont Agel, and affords a clear view of the coast and sea at times when Mont Agel is in or above the clouds. The post has two blocks: an entry block with a machine gun port and the observation block with one machine gun/observation cloche.

Four other observation posts are associated with Mont Agel, including Mont-Gros principal, Mont-Agel abri nord and Cime de Cabanelles. The Observatiore Est de Mont-Agel is a larger post designed and constructed to CORF standards, sometimes called Block 8 of Mont Agel even though it was not connected to the ouvrage.

Two instruction casemates were built at Mont Agel, facing north. A 75mm gun casemate is located between the réduit and the ouvrage on the southwest corner of the plateau, while an 81mm mortar casemate is located at the north end.

== Forteresse du Mont Agel ==
The Fortress of Mont Agel was built between 1889 and 1892 as part of the Séré de Rivières system of fortifications. The main réduit was sited on the southwestern side of the roughly 1,000-metre (3,300 ft) by 500-metre (1,600 ft) summit plateau, overlooking Nice. It is now the site of the main facilities of Base Aérienne 943 and has been extensively altered. A barracks was located near the center of the plateau, while several batteries, designated by number, were located around the plateau, all enclosed by a wall. Battery A became the Maginot entry. Battery B has been obscured by later changes, but its underground magazine remains. Battery C mounted four 95mm guns at the middle of the east side of the plateau. Battery D was located on the southeast side of the plateau, with Battery E nearby. None of these batteries exist in their original state. In 1897 six emplacements were prepared for additional artillery, ranging from 90mm guns at positions 1 and 2 to 220mm mortars at Battery 3. Battery 4 was a prepared site for field artillery, and Battery 5 was planned for four de Bange 120 mm or 155 mm guns.

== History ==
The Mont Agel ouvrage was originally planned as a series of casemates in the eastern edge of the summit plateau, with four casemates each for 75mm and 155mm guns. An access gallery would run across the width of the plateau to an aerial tram station. The plan that was adopted and built was much more compact and could fire in all directions. The ouvrage was built by Thorrand et Cie. between November 1931 and July 1933 at a cost of 23 million francs, including the observation post. The aerial tram cost 1 million francs.

On 23 June 1940 Mont Agel's 75mm gun turrets fired at least 1251 shots at Italian forces assaulting Ouvrage Cap Martin, destroying an Italian armored train in the process.

On 6 September 1944, allied cruisers opened fire with eight-inch guns on Mont Agel, forcing the German garrison to withdraw into the galleries. A ground attack followed and the ouvrage was captured.

The ouvrage and Fortress Mont Agel are occupied by Nice Air Base of the French Air Force and feature a prominent set of radomes.

== See also ==
- List of Alpine Line ouvrages

== Bibliography ==
- Allcorn, William. The Maginot Line 1928-45. Oxford: Osprey Publishing, 2003. ISBN 1-84176-646-1
- Kaufmann, J.E. and Kaufmann, H.W. Fortress France: The Maginot Line and French Defenses in World War II, Stackpole Books, 2006. ISBN 0-275-98345-5
- Kaufmann, J.E., Kaufmann, H.W., Jancovič-Potočnik, A. and Lang, P. The Maginot Line: History and Guide, Pen and Sword, 2011. ISBN 978-1-84884-068-3
- Mary, Jean-Yves; Hohnadel, Alain; Sicard, Jacques. Hommes et Ouvrages de la Ligne Maginot, Tome 1. Paris, Histoire & Collections, 2001. ISBN 2-908182-88-2 (in French)
- Mary, Jean-Yves; Hohnadel, Alain; Sicard, Jacques. Hommes et Ouvrages de la Ligne Maginot, Tome 4 - La fortification alpine. Paris, Histoire & Collections, 2009. ISBN 978-2-915239-46-1 (in French)
- Mary, Jean-Yves; Hohnadel, Alain; Sicard, Jacques. Hommes et Ouvrages de la Ligne Maginot, Tome 5. Paris, Histoire & Collections, 2009. ISBN 978-2-35250-127-5 (in French)
