= Ouvrage Baisse de Saint-Véran =

Ouvrage Baisse de Saint Véran
- Part of Maginot Line, Alpine Line
- Southeast France

Site information
- Controlled by: France

Location
- Coordinates: 44.01628°N 7.42361°E

Site history
- Built by: CORF/MOM
- In use: Abandoned
- Materials: Concrete, steel, rock excavation
- Battles/wars: Italian invasion of France, Operation Dragoon

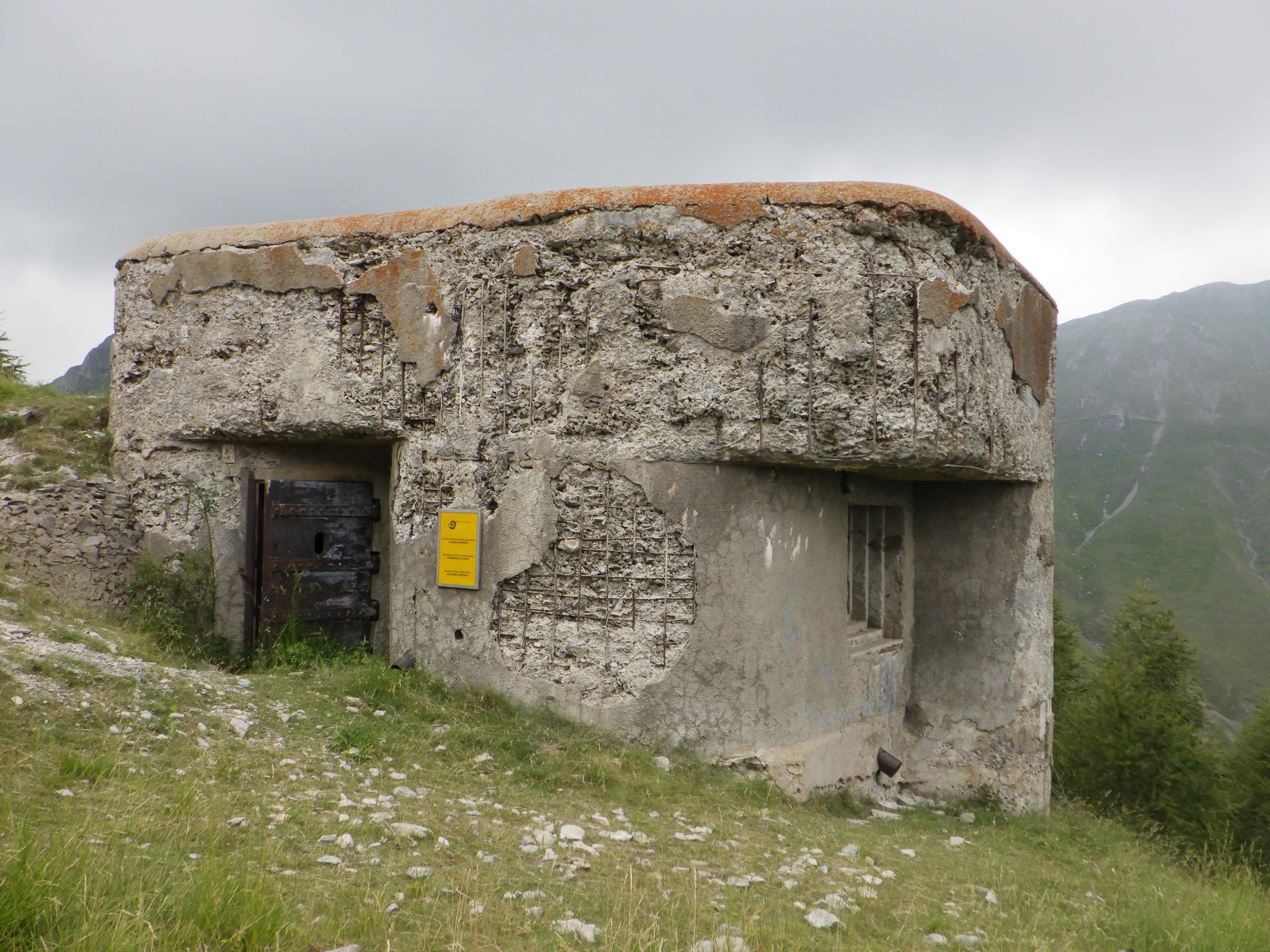
Block 2 of the Ouvrage Baisse de Saint-Véran (Maginot Line Alpine extension).

Ouvrage Baisse de Saint Véran is a lesser work (petit ouvrage) of the Maginot Line's Alpine extension, the Alpine Line. The ouvrage consists of one infantry block facing Italy. Three combat blocks and an entrance block were planned, but only Block 2 was built, with one observation/light machine gun cloche, three light machine gun embrasures and one heavy twin machine gun embrasure at an altitude of 1915 meters. However, armament was never furnished and the cloche was not fitted. Almost none of the supporting subterranean galleries were completed. The position was manned in 1940 by 68 soldiers of the 40th Demi-Brigade des Fusiliers Alpins under Sub-Lieutenant Kessler.

== See also ==
- List of Alpine Line ouvrages

== Bibliography ==
- Allcorn, William. The Maginot Line 1928-45. Oxford: Osprey Publishing, 2003. ISBN 1-84176-646-1
- Kaufmann, J.E. and Kaufmann, H.W. Fortress France: The Maginot Line and French Defenses in World War II, Stackpole Books, 2006. ISBN 0-275-98345-5
- Kaufmann, J.E., Kaufmann, H.W., Jancovič-Potočnik, A. and Lang, P. The Maginot Line: History and Guide, Pen and Sword, 2011. ISBN 978-1-84884-068-3
- Mary, Jean-Yves; Hohnadel, Alain; Sicard, Jacques. Hommes et Ouvrages de la Ligne Maginot, Tome 1. Paris, Histoire & Collections, 2001. ISBN 2-908182-88-2 (in French)
- Mary, Jean-Yves; Hohnadel, Alain; Sicard, Jacques. Hommes et Ouvrages de la Ligne Maginot, Tome 4 - La fortification alpine. Paris, Histoire & Collections, 2009. ISBN 978-2-915239-46-1 (in French)
- Mary, Jean-Yves; Hohnadel, Alain; Sicard, Jacques. Hommes et Ouvrages de la Ligne Maginot, Tome 5. Paris, Histoire & Collections, 2009. ISBN 978-2-35250-127-5 (in French)
