= Ouvrage Col de Crous =

- Part of Maginot Line, Alpine Line
- Southeast France
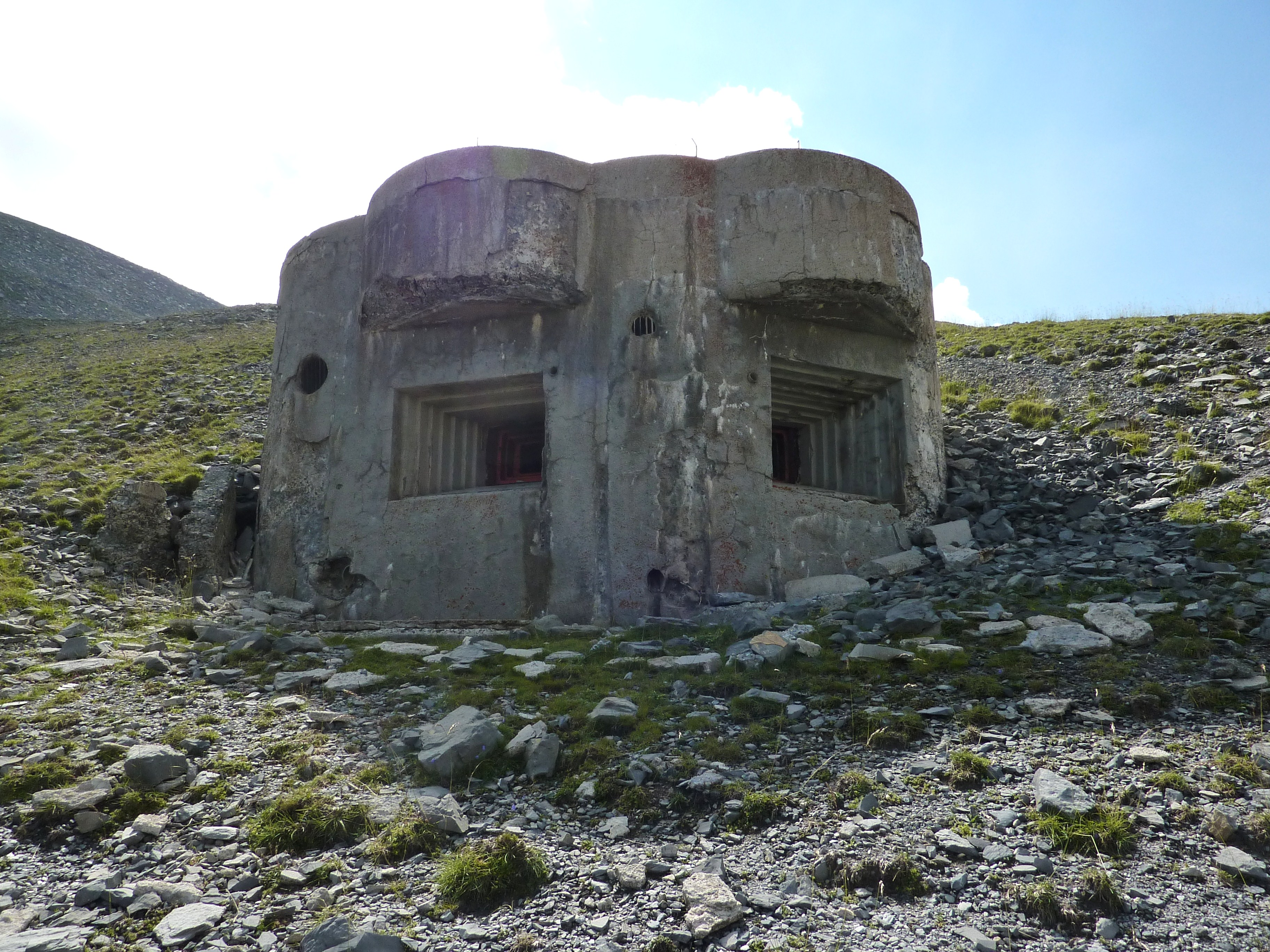

Site information
- Controlled by: France

Location
- Coordinates: 44.16096°N 6.90585°E

Site history
- Built by: CORF
- In use: Abandoned
- Materials: Concrete, steel, rock excavation
- Battles/wars: Italian invasion of France, Operation Dragoon

Ouvrage Col de Crous is a lesser work (petit ouvrage) of the Maginot Line's Alpine extension, the Alpine Line. The ouvrage consists of one infantry block at an altitude of 1,963 metres (6,440 ft). Additional blocks were planned but not built.

== Description ==
- Block 1 (incomplete).
- Block 2 (not built).
- Block 3 (incomplete).
- Block 4 (infantry): two machine gun embrasures.

Two proposed petits ouvrages were proposed for the same ridge to the north, the Ouvrage du Col-de-Pal and the ''Ouvrage du col-de-Jallorgues, neither of which were started.

== See also ==
- List of Alpine Line ouvrages

== Bibliography ==
- Allcorn, William. The Maginot Line 1928–45. Oxford: Osprey Publishing, 2003. ISBN 1-84176-646-1
- Kaufmann, J.E. and Kaufmann, H.W. Fortress France: The Maginot Line and French Defenses in World War II, Stackpole Books, 2006. ISBN 0-275-98345-5
- Kaufmann, J.E., Kaufmann, H.W., Jancovič-Potočnik, A. and Lang, P. The Maginot Line: History and Guide, Pen and Sword, 2011. ISBN 978-1-84884-068-3
- Mary, Jean-Yves; Hohnadel, Alain; Sicard, Jacques. Hommes et Ouvrages de la Ligne Maginot, Tome 1. Paris, Histoire & Collections, 2001. ISBN 2-908182-88-2 (in French)
- Mary, Jean-Yves; Hohnadel, Alain; Sicard, Jacques. Hommes et Ouvrages de la Ligne Maginot, Tome 4 - La fortification alpine. Paris, Histoire & Collections, 2009. ISBN 978-2-915239-46-1 (in French)
- Mary, Jean-Yves; Hohnadel, Alain; Sicard, Jacques. Hommes et Ouvrages de la Ligne Maginot, Tome 5. Paris, Histoire & Collections, 2009. ISBN 978-2-35250-127-5 (in French)
