= Sainte-Agnès, Alpes-Maritimes =

Commune in Provence-Alpes-Côte d'Azur, France

Sainte-Agnès Sant Anha (Occitan)
- Commune
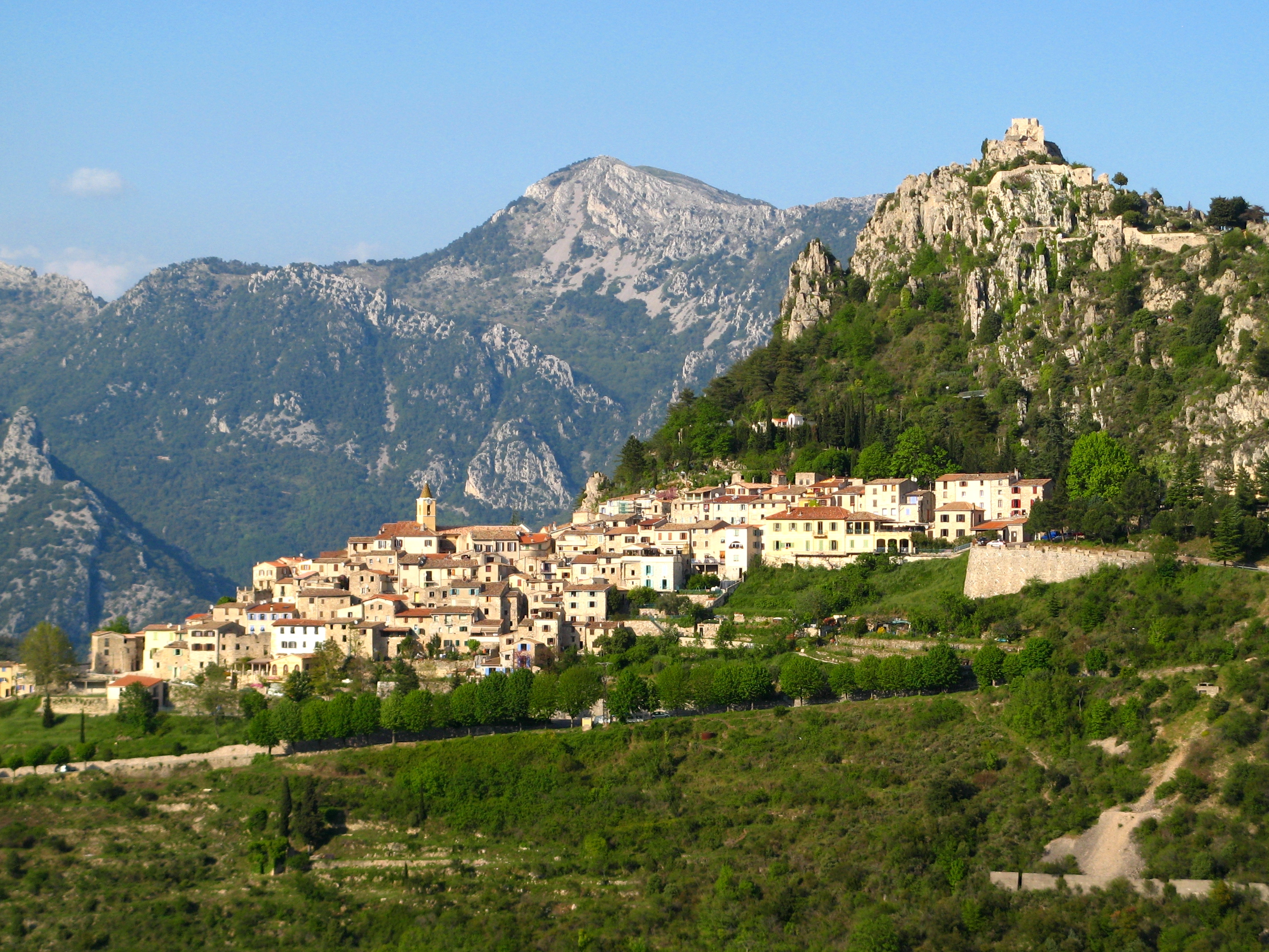
- A view of Sainte-Agnès

- Coat of arms
- Location of Sainte-Agnès
- Location within France Location within Provence-Alpes-Côte d'Azur
- Coordinates: 43°48′05″N 7°27′44″E
- Country: France
- Region: Provence-Alpes-Côte d'Azur
- Department: Alpes-Maritimes
- Arrondissement: Nice
- Canton: Menton
- Intercommunality: CA Riviera Française

Government
  - Mayor (2026–32): Albert Filippi
- Area^{1}: 9.37 km^{2} (3.62 sq mi)
- Highest elevation: 1,238 m (4,062 ft)
- Lowest elevation: 66 m (217 ft)
- Population (2023): 1,380
  - Density: 147/km^{2} (381/sq mi)
- Time zone: UTC+01:00 (CET)
  - Summer (DST): UTC+02:00 (CEST)
- INSEE/Postal code: 06113 /06500
- ^{1} French Land Register data, which excludes lakes, ponds, glaciers > 1 km^{2} (0.386 sq mi or 247 acres) and river estuaries.

Sainte-Agnès (French pronunciation: [sɛ̃t aɲɛs]; Occitan: Sant Anha, Sant Anh, Santa Anhès or Santa Anh; Vivaro-Alpine: Santa Anha) is a commune in the Alpes-Maritimes department in the Provence-Alpes-Côte d'Azur region in Southeastern France. It is the highest village in the area, perched 800 metres above the level of the Mediterranean Sea. It was included on the list of Les Plus Beaux Villages de France (The Most Beautiful Villages of France) in 1997.

== History ==
The Fort Maginot de Sainte-Agnès, which was built as part of the Maginot Line in 1932, is now a museum. It was built to defend the area against possible Italian and German invasion. It successfully participated in the French victory over the invading Italian army in June 1940. Tourist can enter the fort which could house between 300 and 400 soldiers for up to three months. Tour schedules are irregular so tourists have to make sure to confirm before visiting.

== Geography ==
The narrow road to the village provides views of Roquebrune-Cap-Martin, Menton and on to Italy. Visitors can get to Menton by train and take the bus (line 10) from the Gare Routière station to Sainte-Agnès. It is also possible to drive for 25 minutes along the scenic road. The village sits overlooking the city of Menton and the Mediterranean.

== Demographics ==
Historical population
Year	Pop.	±% p.a.
1968	304	—
1975	361	+2.49%
1982	455	+3.36%
1990	944	+9.55%
1999	1,094	+1.65%
2007	1,191	+1.07%
2012	1,169	−0.37%
2017	1,328	+2.58%
2023	1,380	+0.64%
Source: INSEE

== See also ==
- Communes of the Alpes-Maritimes department
