= Ouvrage Sainte-Agnès =

- la ligne Maginot
- Part of Maginot Line, Alpine Line
- Sainte-Agnès, Alpes-Maritimes
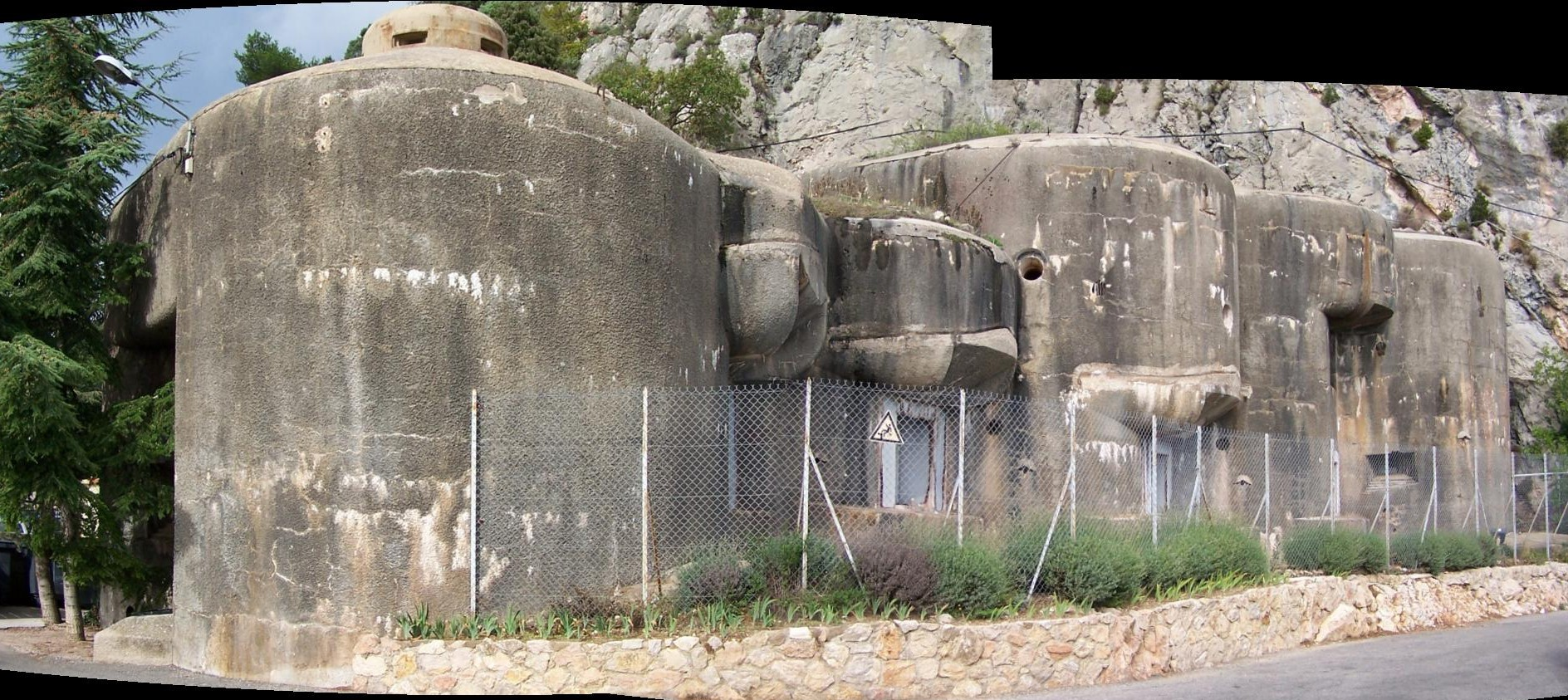
- Ouvrage Sainte-Agnès

Site information
- Code: FR
- Owner: Sainte-Agnès
- Controlled by: France
- Open to the public: Yes
- Condition: Restored

Location
- Coordinates: 43.798906°N 7.462519°E

Site history
- Built: 1931
- Built by: CORF
- Materials: Concrete, steel, rock excavation
- Battles/wars: Italian invasion of France, Operation Dragoon

Ouvrage Sainte-Agnès was a work (gros ouvrage) of the Maginot Line's Alpine extension, the Alpine Line, also called the Little Maginot Line. The fortification was built between 1932 and 1938. The site is at the south edge of the hill town of Sainte-Agnès, Alpes-Maritimes at an elevation of 780 metres overlooking the Mediterranean Sea.

In the 16th century the House of Savoy built a fortification in Sainte-Agnès, which was a strategic location between the Counts of Provence and Genoa. The fortress saw actions between the French and the Sardinians, becoming a possession of the Kingdom of Piedmont-Sardinia between 1814 and 1860 before returning to France.

The Maginot fortification was planned to defend the Bay of Menton and to prevent attack on the coastal cities from the north. The ouvrage consisted of one entry block, two artillery blocks, two infantry blocks and one observation block facing Italy. There are approximately 2000 square metres of underground space under more than 55 metres of rock cover.

== Description ==
The ouvrage was built between November 1931 and October 1934 by a contractor named Borie, at a cost of 16.8 million francs. In 1940 it was commanded by Captain Panzani. Ten observation posts reported to Sainte-Agnès.

- Block 1 (entry): One machine gun embrasure and one machine gun cloche and one grenade launcher cloche.
- Block 2 (artillery block): One machine gun turret, one grenade launcher cloche, one twin machine gun port, two 75mm gun ports and two 81mm mortar ports. Block 2 was equipped with optical signalling equipment aimed at Ouvrage Roquebrunne and Ouvrage Mont Agel.
- Block 3 (artillery block): One machine gun turret, one observation cloche, one twin machine gun port, two 75mm gun ports, two 81mm mortar ports and two 135mm gun ports. Block 3 faces north, just under the ruins of the château.
- Block 4 (observation block): One machine gun/observation turret and one machine gun port.
- Block 5 (infantry block): One machine gun port, not linked to the main ouvrage.
- Block 6 (infantry block): One machine gun port, not linked to the main ouvrage.

=== Observation posts ===
The observation post at Pic-de-Garuche 43°49′24.37″N 07°27′35.04″E, while closer to Ouvrage Castillon to the north, reported to Saint-Agnès. The post comprised an entry block and an observation block with a unique example of a VP cloche. The design was by CORF, the primary Maginot design organization, but construction was managed by MOM (Main d’Œuvre Militaire), which carried out the construction of many of the lesser posts.

Nine smaller observation posts are associated with Sainte-Agnès, including Garuche, Banquettes, Cime de Biancon, Pic-de-Garuche-Sud, Siricocca, and cote 902. Cote 902 was a CORF project, located to the east of Pic-du-Garuche to protect the flanks of Sainte-Agnès and Castillon. Planned 81mm mortars were not installed.

== Actions ==
Ouvrage Sainte Agnes held against the Italian offensive of 1940, firing on Italian troops advancing along the coast. 1,201 rounds were fired from the 75 mm guns, 80 from 81 mm mortars, and 234 from 135 mm guns. Saint-Agnès fired on the coastal roads on 21 June, and on the Col du Razet the next day to discourage Italians advancing toward the avants-postes of Scuvion and Pierre-Pontue. Firing from Sainte-Agnès' artillery blocks was supported by a nearby battery of mobile 155 mm guns. On 23 June Block 3 fired again against infiltrators around Scuvion and Pierre-Pontue, and later on Italian columns around Menton.

The ouvrage remained in government hands until 1990, when it was transferred to the town of Sainte-Agnès and was opened to the public as a museum. It is open for visitation during summer months.

== See also ==
- List of Alpine Line ouvrages

== Bibliography ==
- Allcorn, William. The Maginot Line 1928-45. Oxford: Osprey Publishing, 2003. ISBN 1-84176-646-1
- Kaufmann, J.E. and Kaufmann, H.W. Fortress France: The Maginot Line and French Defenses in World War II, Stackpole Books, 2006. ISBN 0-275-98345-5
- Kaufmann, J.E., Kaufmann, H.W., Jancovič-Potočnik, A. and Lang, P. The Maginot Line: History and Guide, Pen and Sword, 2011. ISBN 978-1-84884-068-3
- Mary, Jean-Yves; Hohnadel, Alain; Sicard, Jacques. Hommes et Ouvrages de la Ligne Maginot, Tome 1. Paris, Histoire & Collections, 2001. ISBN 2-908182-88-2 (in French)
- Mary, Jean-Yves; Hohnadel, Alain; Sicard, Jacques. Hommes et Ouvrages de la Ligne Maginot, Tome 4 - La fortification alpine. Paris, Histoire & Collections, 2009. ISBN 978-2-915239-46-1 (in French)
- Mary, Jean-Yves; Hohnadel, Alain; Sicard, Jacques. Hommes et Ouvrages de la Ligne Maginot, Tome 5. Paris, Histoire & Collections, 2009. ISBN 978-2-35250-127-5 (in French)
