= List of Alpine Line ouvrages =

The Little Maginot Line (click to enlarge). Numbers on the map correspond with the list below.

This is the list of all ouvrages of the Alpine Line or Little Maginot Line along the Franco-Italian border, organized by sector and type of fortification. Ouvrage translates as "works" in English; publications in both English and French refer to these fortifications in this manner, rather than as "forts". An ouvrage typically consists of a distributed series of concrete-encased strongpoints defending a region, linked by tunnels, as opposed to a fort, which typically refers to a defended surface enclosure, which may have underground galleries as an adjunct.

For a list of the ouvrages of the main Maginot Line, refer to List of Maginot Line ouvrages.

== Fortified Sector of Savoy (La Tarentaise) ==
=== Ouvrage ===
- 1 - Ouvrage Chatelard (PO)
- 1 - Ouvrage Cave Canon (PO)

== Fortified Sector of Savoy (La Maurienne) ==
=== Ouvrages ===
- 2 - Ouvrage Sapey (GO)
- 3 - Ouvrage Saint Gobain (GO)
- 4 - Ouvrage Saint Antoine (GO)
- 5 - Ouvrage Le Lavoir (GO)
- 6 - Ouvrage Pas du Roc (GO)
- 6- Ouvrage Arrondaz (PO)
- 6 - Ouvrage Les Rochilles (PO)

== Fortified Sector of Dauphiné ==
=== Ouvrages ===
- 7 - Ouvrage Janus (GO)
- 7 - Ouvrage Col de Buffere (PO)
- 7 - Ouvrage Col du Granon (PO)
- 7 - Ouvrage Les Aittes (PO)
- 8 - Ouvrage Gondran (PO)
- 9 - Ouvrage Roche Lacroix (GO)
- 10 - Ouvrage Saint Ours Haut (GO)
- 10 - Ouvrage Plate Lombard (PO)
- 11 - Ouvrage Fontvive Nord-ouest (PO)
- 11 - Ouvrage Saint Ours Nord-est (PO)
- 11 - Ouvrage Saint Ours Bas (PO)
- 11 - Ouvrage Ancien Camp (PO)
- 12 - Ouvrage Restefond (GO)
- 12 - Ouvrage Col de Restefond (PO)
- 12 - Ouvrage Granges Communes (PO)
- 12 - Ouvrage La Moutiere (PO)

== Fortified Sector of the Maritime Alps ==
=== Ouvrages ===
- 14 - Ouvrage Col de Crous (PO)
- 14 - Ouvrage Rimplas (GO)
- 14 - Ouvrage Fressinen (PO)
- 14 - Ouvrage Valdeblore (PO)
- 14 - Ouvrage La Serena
- 14 - Ouvrage Col du Caire Gros (PO)
- 14 - Ouvrage Col du Fort (PO)
- 15 - Ouvrage Gordolon (GO)
- 16 - Ouvrage Flaut (GO)
- 17 - Ouvrage Baisse de Saint Veran (PO)
- 17 - Ouvrage Plan Caval (PO)
- 17 - Ouvrage La Beole (PO)
- 17 - Ouvrage Col Agnon (PO)
- 17 - Ouvrage La Dea (PO)
- 18 - Ouvrage Col de Brouis (GO)
- 19 - Ouvrage Monte Grosso (GO)
- 19 - Ouvrage Champ de Tir (PO)
- 20 - Ouvrage L'Agaisen (GO)
- 21 - Ouvrage Saint Roch (GO)
- 22 - Ouvrage Barbonnet (GO)
- 23 - Ouvrage Castillon (GO)
- 23 - Ouvrage Col des Banquettes (PO)
- 24 - Ouvrage Sainte Agnes (GO)
- 24 - Ouvrage Col des Gardes (PO)
- 25 - Ouvrage Mont Agel (GO)
- 26 - Ouvrage Roquebrunne (GO)
- 26 - Ouvrage Croupe du Reservoir (PO)
- 27 - Ouvrage Cap Martin (GO)
