= VDP cloche =

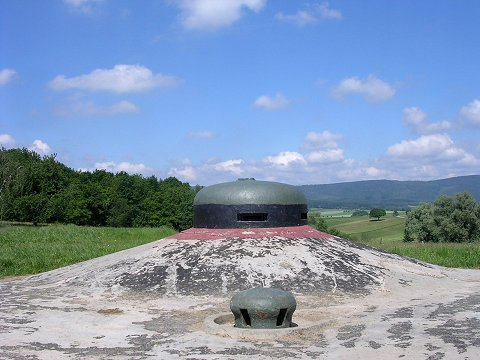
A VDP cloche of Block 4, Ouvrage Schoenenbourg, with a ventilation mushroom in the foreground

The VDP cloche was an element of the Maginot Line fortifications. A cloche (bell) was a fixed and non-retractable firing position made of a thick iron casting which shielded its occupant. By comparison, turrets could be rotated and sometimes lowered so that only the top shell was exposed. VDP cloches were used for observation of the surrounding area for artillery direction. VDP is an acronym for Vision Directe et Périscopique. By comparison with the GFM cloche, the VDP cloche had narrower ports and was consequently lower in profile.

== Description ==
VDP cloches were equipped with three embrasures or crenels for direct vision, providing protection to observers. VDP cloches were also equipped with periscopes that allowed a greater arc of view. The cloches were embedded in a thick concrete carapace over a combat, entrance or observation block element of a largely subterranean Maginot fortification. A platform, identical to that used in the GFM cloche, was installed for the observer within the cloche. No armament was fitted. 64 VDP cloches were installed along the Maginot Line.

== VP cloche ==
The similar VP (Vision Périscopique) cloche lacked direct observation ports, presenting a much lower profile. Twenty VP cloches were installed.

== See also ==
- JM cloche, heavy twin machine gun cloche
- LG cloche, grenade launcher cloche

== Bibliography ==
- Mary, Jean-Yves; Hohnadel, Alain; Sicard, Jacques. Hommes et Ouvrages de la Ligne Maginot, Tome 2. Paris, Histoire & Collections, 2001. ISBN 2-908182-97-1 (in French)
