= GFM cloche =

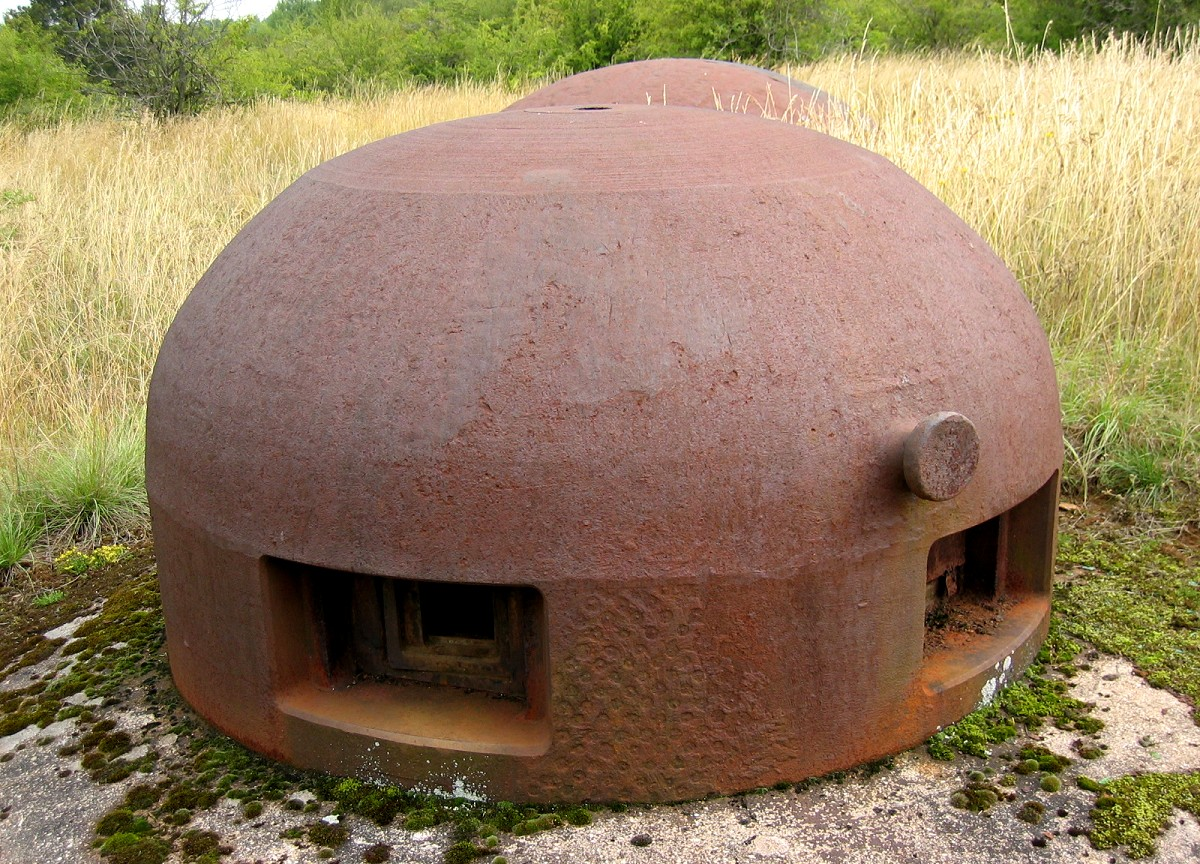
GFM Type A cloche at Ouvrage Molvange

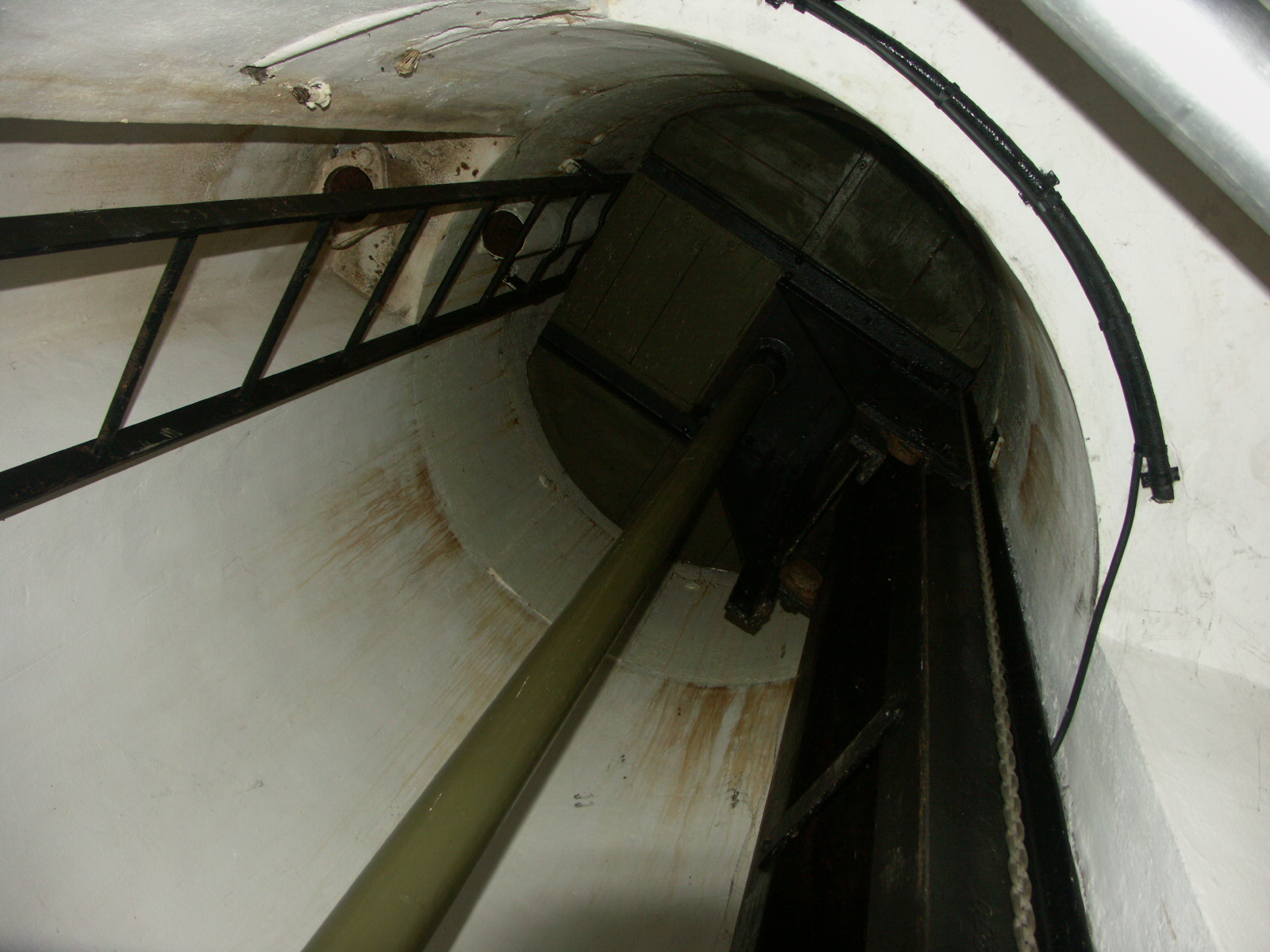
Interior of a GFM cloche, looking upward at the Abri de Hatten

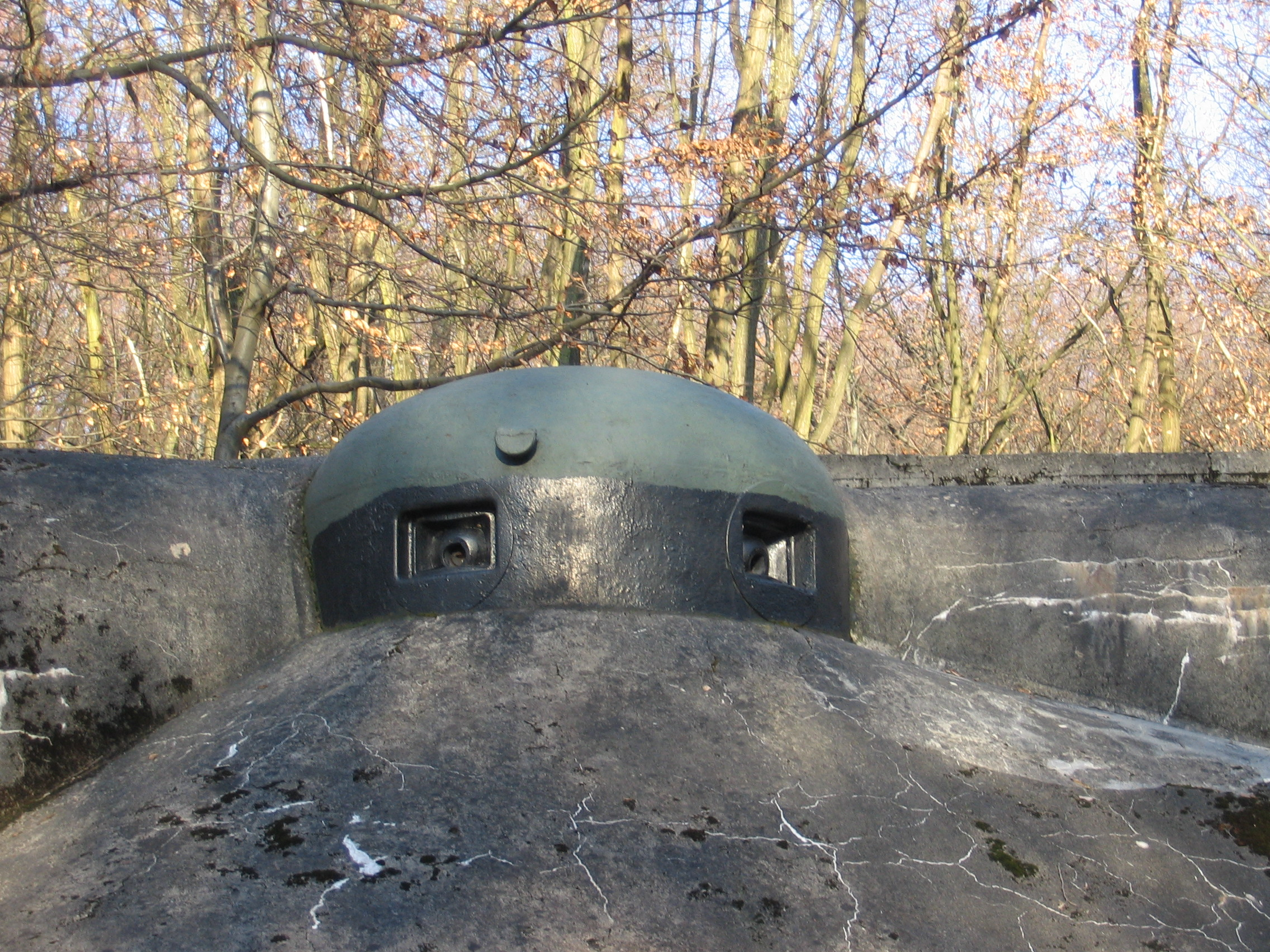
GFM Type B cloche at Ouvrage Schoenenbourg

The GFM cloche was one of the most common defensive armaments on the Maginot Line. A cloche (bell) was a fixed and non-retractable firing position made of a thick iron casting which shielded its occupant. By comparison, turrets could be rotated and sometimes lowered so that only the top shell was exposed.

GFM is an acronym for Guetteur et Fusil-Mitrailleur (lookout and rifle-machine-gunner), which describes its purpose as a lookout and firing position for light weapons. Most of the bunkers or blocks in a Maginot Line ouvrage were fitted with several fixed armoured cupolas or cloches. The cupolas were designed to allow the soldiers to perform reconnaissance or repel an attack with an absolute maximum of cover, from inside the bunker. The armament of each cloche varied significantly, but were typically equipped with some combination of:

- Light machine guns or automatic rifles
- Vision blocks
- Mounted binoculars
- A periscope (located on the top of the bell)
- A 50 mm mortar

== Description ==
The cloche consisted of two sections of cast iron: a lining or base that sat over a corresponding circular shaft in the concrete combat block, and the cloche itself, for the 1929 model 2.7 metres (8.9 ft) tall and 1.6 metres (5.2 ft) in outside diameter, projecting about 0.52 metres (1.7 ft) above a concrete apron. The apron sloped away from the cloche for drainage and to allow a depressed field of fire. The interior contained a platform arranged so that one occupant could fire from one of several openings in the 20-centimetre (7.9 in) thick bell. Firing openings were rectangular, and were fitted with a variety of shutters or firing ports, typically stepped to deflect shots away from the opening. A hose could be attached to the weapon to remove gun fumes. Ear-like lifting points projected to each side of the exposed portion of the cloche.

== Variants ==
There were two principal types of GFM cloche, each with a set of subtypes. The 1929 Type A cloche was the initial model, with a short variant, a longer version, a wider version, and a model that could accommodate two soldiers. The 1934 Type B cloche was larger in diameter, with thicker armor. The gun ports were redesigned to fire through a ball fitting that was more resistant to opposing fire. Some Type A cloches were fitted with the new ports.

== Periscope ==
Some GFM cloches possessed a shuttered fitting at the top of the bell through which a periscope could be raised.

== See also ==
- JM cloche, heavy twin machine gun cloche
- LG cloche, grenade launcher cloche
- VDP cloche, observation cloche

== Bibliography ==
- Mary, Jean-Yves; Hohnadel, Alain; Sicard, Jacques. Hommes et Ouvrages de la Ligne Maginot, Tome 2. Paris, Histoire & Collections, 2001. ISBN 2-908182-97-1 (in French)
