= Fort de la Croix-de-Bretagne =

- Part of Séré de Rivières system, Fortified Sector of the Dauphiné
- Briançon, France
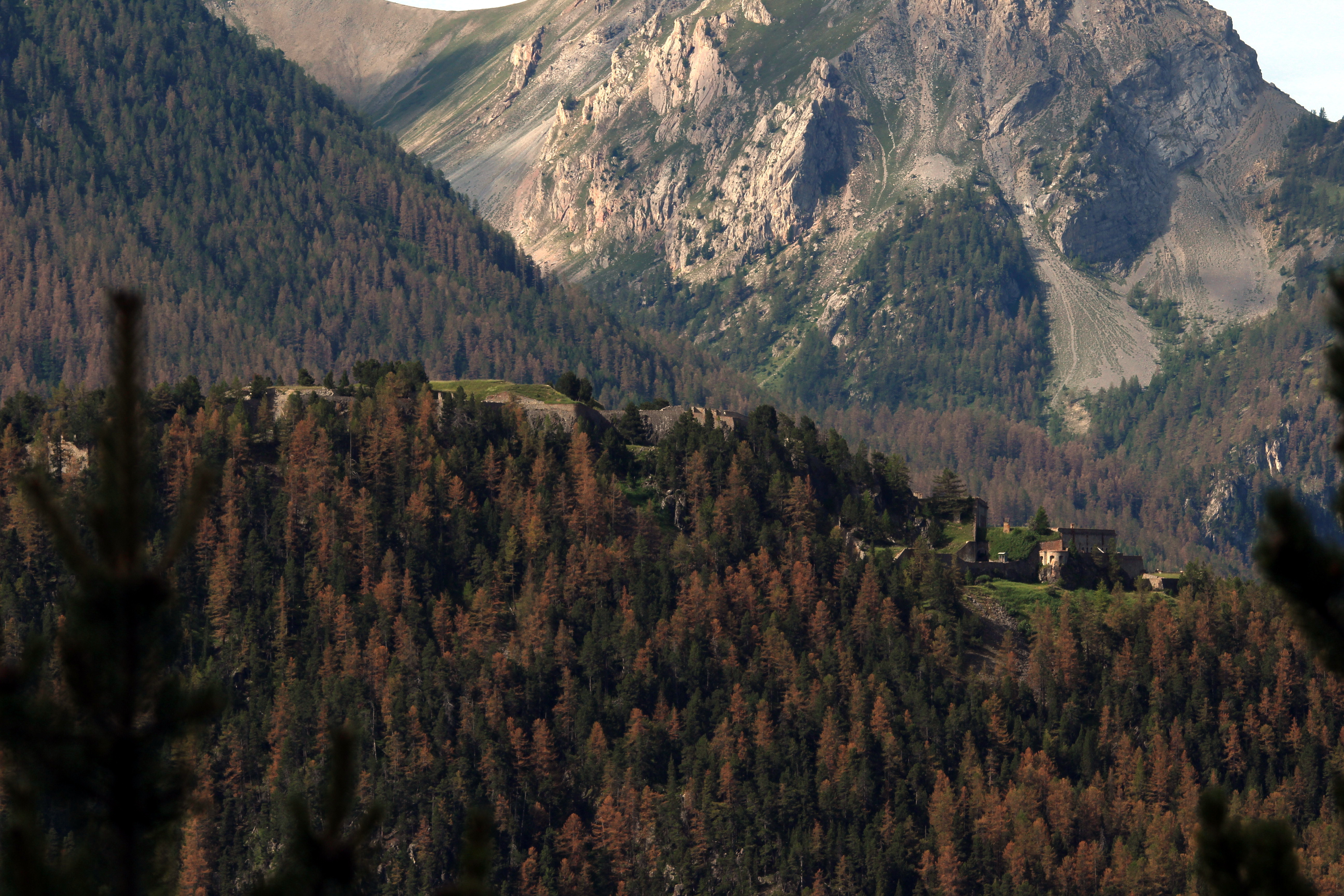

Site information
- Type: Fort
- Owner: French Army
- Controlled by: France
- Condition: Abandoned

Location
- Coordinates: 44.87346°N 6.65487°E

Site history
- Built: 1876

The Fort de la Croix-de-Bretagne is a fortification in the vicinity of Briançon in the Dauphiné region of southeastern France. It was built as part of the Séré de Rivières system of fortifications in 1876–79 to defend France against invasion from Italy, at a cost of 1,416,642 francs. It overlooks the valley of the Durance from an altitude of 2,016 metres (6,614 ft) and monitors the Cervière road to Italy. The position was used by the French Army in the defense of Briançon until 1940, when it was part of the Fortified Sector of the Dauphiné.

The position overlooks the earlier Fort des Têtes and, in conjunction with the Grande Maye, was planned to bar an advance from Italy over the Col de Montgenèvre in the vicinity of the Gondrans. The garrison comprised 496 men, serving seven 155 mm guns, five 138 mm guns and four mortars. Croix-de-Bretagne and the Fort de l'Infernet provided each other mutual support. Built in stone, it was never modernized to deal with explosive projectiles.
