= Fortified Sector of the Dauphiné =

The Fortified Sector of the Dauphiné (Secteur Fortifié du Dauphiné) was the French military organization that in 1940 controlled the section of the Alpine Line portion of the Maginot Line facing Italy in the vicinity of Briançon. By comparison with the integrated defenses of the main Maginot Line, or even of the Fortified Sector of the Maritime Alps to the south, the Dauphiné sector consisted of a series of distinct territories that covered two main invasion routes into France: the route from Turin over the Col de Montgenèvre to Briançon and Grenoble, and the route from Coni over the Col de Larche to Barcelonette and Gap. The sector was the scene of probing attacks by Italian forces during the Italian invasion of France in 1940, in which the French defenses successfully resisted Italian advances until the June 1940 armistice that granted Italy access to southeastern France.

The sector was extensively subdivided into informal districts, sub-sectors and quarters or quartiers, reflecting the fragmented nature of the Alpine landscape in which each valley was a distinct defensive entity. Small units were employed to patrol the border and to man individual posts ranging from observation bunkers to excavated mountaintop artillery ouvrages.

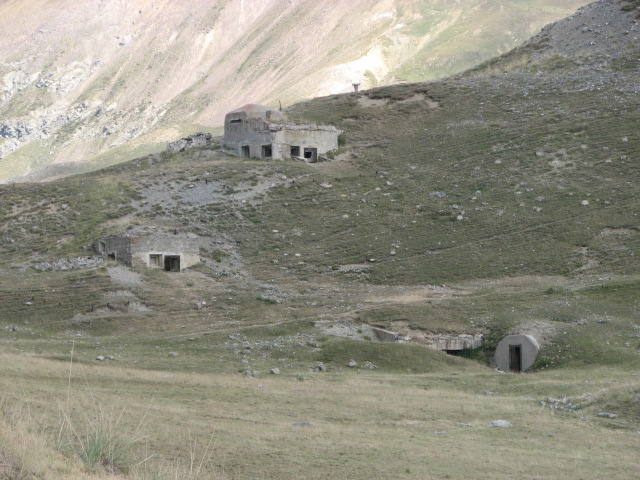
Avant-poste du Col des Fourches, a typical high Alpine frontier post

== Concept and organization ==
The area around Briançon and the Ubaye Valley had already been extensively fortified by Vauban and Raymond Adolphe Séré de Rivières, culminating in the enormous Fort de Tournoux. The Italian Fort Chaberton presented a menace to the area with its heavy battery on a commanding 3,131-metre (10,272 ft) peak just across the border, 11.6 kilometres (7.2 mi) from Briançon. Measures were proposed in 1929 to counteract the threat by building four large ouvrages at Gondran, les Aittes, Janus and les Alberts. These major Alpine positions were to be built by the Commission pour l'Organisation des Régions Fortifiées (CORF), the primary organization dedicated to the planning and funding of the Maginot Line. Resources were soon diverted into fortifications for the SF Alpes-Maritimes to the south, and initial improvements were limited to a reconstruction of the old Fort du Janus.

Other funds were provided to create border posts (avants-postes) close to the frontier. These projects were administered by the Military Works Administration (Main d'Oeuvre Militaire (MOM)), which built more economical but less secure and less strongly-armed versions of the CORF works. MOM avants-postes superficially resembled CORF ouvrages, with underground gallery systems linking individual combat blocks, but lacked heavy armament and thick concrete shielding, as well as independent (or any) electric power supplies and underground troop accommodations. A number of the later CORF-proposed ouvrages were carried out by MOM, many of which were incomplete in 1940. These MOM-built positions covered secondary passes and mountain basins. The Col de Larche corridor was defended by the CORF-built gros ouvrage (Note: English-language sources use the French term ouvrage as the preferred term for the Maginot positions, in preference to "fort", a term usually reserved for older fortifications with passive defenses in the form of walls and ditches. The literal translation of ouvrage in the sense of a fortification in English is "work." A gros ouvrage is a large fortification with a significant artillery component, while a petit ouvrage is smaller, with lighter arms.) Roche-la-Croix, its upper battery and the Forts Tournoux and Viraysse, as well as a variety of CORF positions around Saint-Ours. The Montgenèvre corridor was covered by the extensive network of forts around Briançon, centering on the renovated and expanded fortifications at Janus. The Col de la Bonette received attention as well, despite its 2,800 metres (9,200 ft) altitude, with the gros ouvrage Restefond and three subsidiary petits ouvrages.

Troop units for these fortifications were extensively customized to deal with the fragmented nature of the military positions. Typical, somewhat confusingly-named units included:

- Alpine Fortress Demi-Brigade (Demi-Brigade Alpin de Forteresse (DBAF) )
- Alpine Hunter Demi-Brigade (Demi-Brigade des Chasseurs Alpins (DBCA) )
- Alpine Infantry Regiment (Régiment d'Infanterie Alpin (RIA) )
- Alpine Fortress Battalion (Battaillon Alpin de Forteresse (BAF) )
- Alpine Hunter Battalion (Bataillon des Chasseurs Alpins (BCA) )

These formations were supplemented by Position Artillery Regiments (Régiments d'Artillerie de Position) (RAP) ), which provided mobile artillery support. A demi-brigade was similar to a large regiment, with three demi-brigades equivalent to four regiments.

== Command ==
The Dauphiné sector was under the overall command of the French Army of the Alps, headquartered at Valence, under the command of General René Olry. Subordinate to the Army of the Alps was the 14th Army Corps under General Beynet. The SF Dauphiné itself was commanded by General Cyvoct at Gap and La-Roche-de-Rame. The interval troops, the army formation that was to provide the mobile defense for the sector, to support and be supported by the fixed defenses, was the 64th Infantry Division. Artillery support for the sector was provided by the 154th and 162nd Position Artillery Regiments (Régiment d'Artillerie de Position (RAP)), which controlled both fixed and mobile artillery, commanded by Lt. Colonel Maury and Chef d'Escadron Jarrix, respectively. The 64th ID was made up of Class B reservists, not suited for sustained combat, under General de Saint-Vincent at Embrun.

== Description ==
The sector includes, in order from west to east, the following major fortified positions, together with the most significant casemates and infantry shelters in each sub-sector:

=== Briançonnais district ===
The direct command of the Briançon valley remained with General Cyvoct, with a command post at La Roche-du-Rame, and a forward command post at the Fort du Randouillet.

==== Sub-sector Haute-Clarée-Guisane ====
82nd Alpine Fortress Battalion (82^{e} Bataillon Alpin de Forteresse (BAF)), Lt. Colonel Perdreau, command post at the Bois du Villar

===== Quartier Chardonnet =====
Command post at Chardonnet, elements of the 24th BIL

===== Quartier Bufère-Granon =====
Command post at the Col de Cristol, elements of the 82nd BAF

- Ouvrage Col de Buffère, petit ouvrage of three combat blocks, incomplete (CORF/MOM)
- Ouvrage Col du Granon, petit ouvrage of four combat blocks, incomplete (CORF/MOM)

===== Quartier Peyrolles =====
Command post at the Bois du Villar, 95th Alpine Cavalry Battalion (95^{e} Bataillon des Chasseurs Alpins (BCA))

- Fort de l'Olive, pre-1914 fort near the Col de Granon at 2,239 metres (7,346 ft)
- Blockhaus des Acles, at the Col des Acles on the Italian border, pre-1914
- Blockhaus de la Cleyda, pre-1914
- Blockhaus de Lenlon, pre-1914
- Avant-poste de Plampinet, single gallery, incomplete (MOM)

==== Sub-sector Haute Durance-Cerveyrette ====
72nd Alpine Fortress Battalion (72^{e} Bataillon Alpin de Forteresse (BAF)), Lt. Colonel Brasset, in charge of the defense of Briançon, command post at Randouillet.

===== Quartier Vachette-Janus =====
Command post at La Lame, 91st Alpine Cavalry Battalion (91^{e} Bataillon des Chasseurs Alpins (BCA))

- Ouvrage Janus, gros ouvrage of seven combat blocks and an entrance (CORF)
- Avant-poste du Chenaillet, incomplete gallery system (MOM)
- Fort du Randouillet, pre-1914
- Fort des Trois-Têtes, pre-1914
- Fort de la Croix-de-Bretagne, Séré de Rivières system
- Fort de l'Infernet, Séré de Rivières system
- Barrage du Pont-de-la-Vachette, anti-tank barrier
- Barrage de Montgenèvre (Clot Enjaime), anti-tank barrier (CORF)
- Observatiore/Batterie de la Croix-de-Toulouse, observation post reporting to Janus, with a prepared location for an artillery battery
- Abri de la Lame, abri-caverne, command post
- Blockhaus de la Grand-Maye
- Blockhaus de la Lausette, pre-1914

Ouvrage la Vachette was started 20 March 1940, no substantial progress made before war broke out. A stop line of about 25 smaller fortifications was constructed in the area. These fortifications have been cleaned up and may be visited.

===== Quartier Gondran-Aittes =====
Command post at La Seyte, elements of the 72nd BAF

- Ouvrage Gondran (Gondran E, Godran Est), petit ouvrage of five blocks (CORF)
- Ouvrage Les Aittes, petit ouvrage of four blocks (CORF)
- Gondran C, old fort
- Gondran D, old fort

Barracks for peacetime:

- Casernement de Briançon
- Casernement du Fort du Randouillet
- Casernement du Fort des Têtes
- Baraquement du Col du Granon
- Baraquement de Clôt-Enjaime

A number of concrete emplacements were built by the Main d'Oeuvre Militaire (MOM) in the quarter.

=== Vallée du Queyras region ===
The Queyras valley was commanded by Lt. Colonel Bonnet of the 45th DBCA, with a command post at Guillestre, and a forward command post at Villargaudin.

==== Sub-sector Guil ====
45th Alpine Cavalry Demi-Brigade (45e Demi-Brigade des Chasseurs Alpins (DBCA)), Lt. Colonel Martin, command post at the Villargaudin.

===== Quartier Péas =====
No fixed positions, 107th Alpine Cavalry Battalion (107^{e} Bataillon des Chasseurs Alpins (BCA)), command post at Fort Queyras.

===== Quartier Queyras =====
No fixed positions, 87th Alpine Cavalry Battalion (87^{e} Bataillon des Chasseurs Alpins (BCA)) and elements of the 92nd BAF, command post at La Motte Tremblante.

- Pont-du-Roi, anti-tank barricade

===== Quartier Sommet-Bucher =====
Five small avants postes, manned by the 1st and 3rd companies of the 92nd BAF and a company of the 87th BCA., command post at Sommet-Bucher.

===== Quartier Ceillac =====
102nd Alpine Fortress Battalion (102^{e} Bataillon Alpin de Forterresse (BAF)), command post at the Col de Bramousse.

A number of concrete emplacements were built by the MOM in the quarter.

=== Vallée de l'Ubaye district ===
Colonel Dessaux, command post at either Jausiers or Batterie XII at Tournoux.

==== Sub-sector /Ubaye-Ubayette ====
83rd Alpine Fortress Battalion (83^{e} Bataillon Alpin de Forterresse (BAF)), command post at the Fort Moyen at Tournoux.

===== Quartier Saint-Paul =====
Command post at Grande=Serrenne

- Ouvrage Plate Lombard (PL), petit ouvrage of four blocks (MOM)

===== Quartier Meyronnes =====
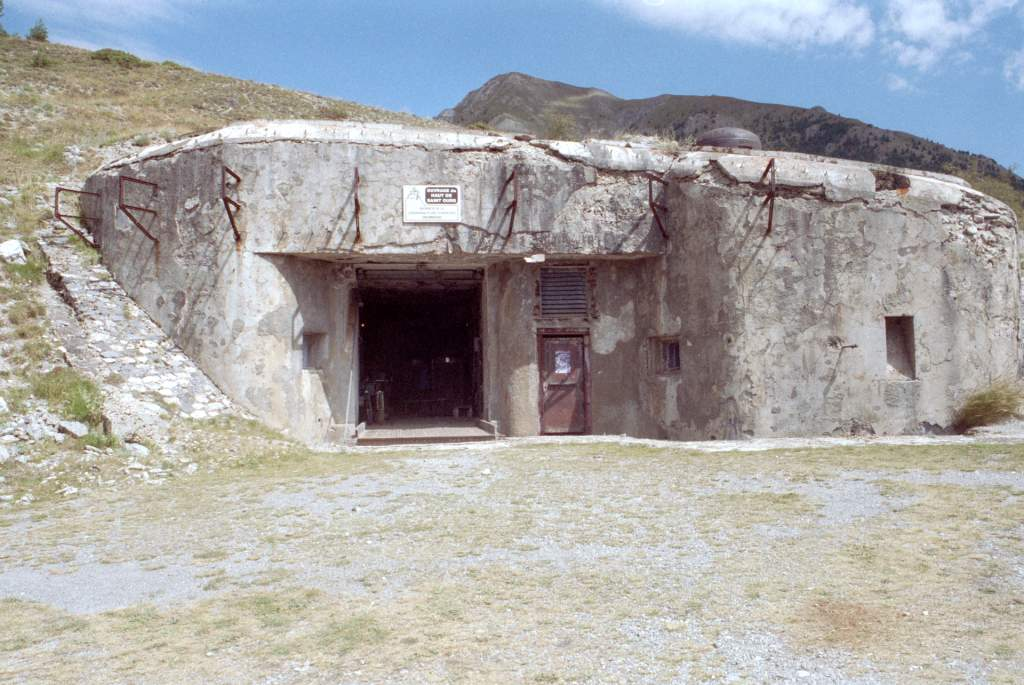
Ouvrage Saint-Ours Haut

- Ouvrage Saint Ours Haut (SOH), petit ouvrage of five blocks (CORF)
- Ouvrage Nord-Est de Saint-Ours (NESO), petit ouvrage of two blocks (CORF)
- Ouvrage Nord-Ouest de Fontvive (NOF), petit ouvrage of two blocks (CORF)
- Ouvrage Saint Ours Bas (SOB), petit ouvrage, single block (CORF)
- Ouvrage Roche-la-Croix (RLC), gros ouvrage of five blocks built into a pre-1914 fort (CORF)
- Ouvrage Ancien Camp (AC), petit ouvrage or abri passif of two blocks (MOM)
- Fort de Tournoux, an elaborate series of pre-1914 fortifications
  - Batterie XII at valley level with four casemates
  - Fort Grouchy at an intermediate level
  - Fort Supérieure on the heights
  - Batterie du Claus des Caures
  - Batterie du Vallon Claous
  - Fortin de Serre de Laut, anti-aircraft battery
- Fort de Viraysse, pre-1914 at 2,700 metres (8,900 ft)
- Avant-post de Larche (L), of six blocks (MOM)
- Batterie du Roche-la-Croix Supérieure, pre-1914 artillery battery
- Observatoire de la Duyère, series of observation points
- Observatoire des Challances, observation point
- Observatoire de Serre-la-Plate (SLP), two-block observation post (MOM)
- Abri Nord-Est de Saint-Ours (NESO)
- Barrage du Cimitière de Larche
- Blockhaus du Colombier MOM Rocher

==== Sub-sector Jausiers ====
157th Alpine Fortress Demi-Brigade (157e Demi-Brigade Alpin de Forteresse (DBAF)) and 73rd BAF

===== Quartier Sagnes =====
First company of the 73rd BAF. Ouvrage des Sagnes was proposed but not built.

===== Quartier Restefond =====
Second company of the 73rd BAF.

- Ouvrage Col de Restefond (RD), petit ouvrage of three blocks (CORF)
- Ouvrage Restefond (RE), gros ouvrage of six blocks (CORF)
- Ouvrage Granges Communes (GC), petit ouvrage of two blocks (CORF)
- Avant-poste des Fourches (FO), six blocks watching the Col des Fourches (MOM)

===== Quartier Rougna =====
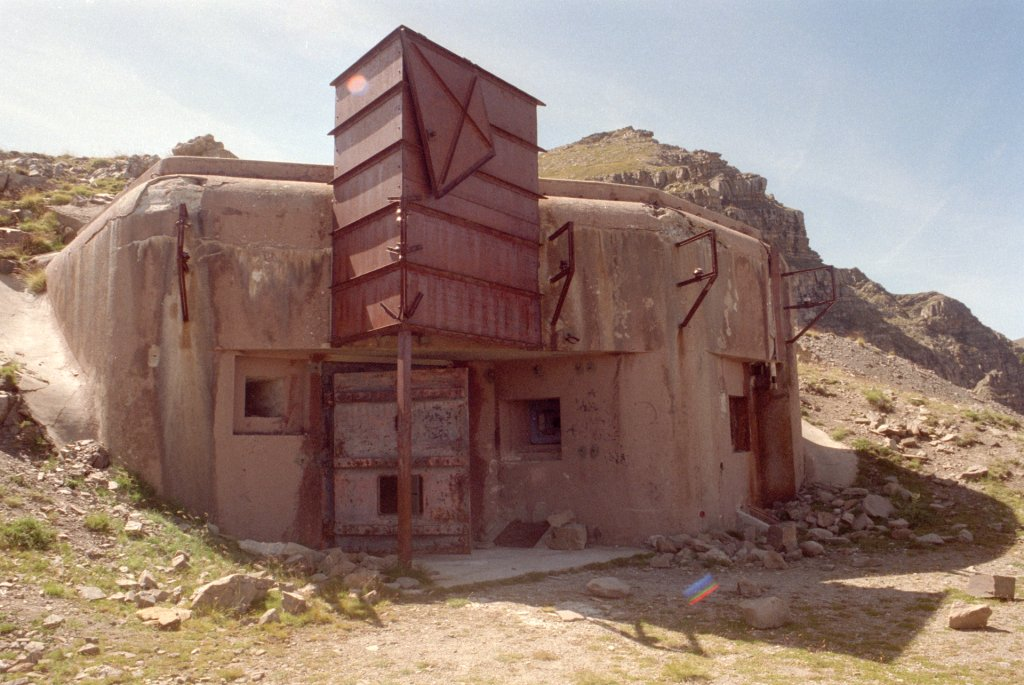
Ouvrage La Moutière with ventilation shaft for winter snows

- Ouvrage La Moutière (MO), petit ouvrage of four blocks (CORF)
- Abri de la Moutière with four entries (MOM)
- Avant-poste du Pra (LP), five blocks to watch the Pra valley (MOM)
- Casernement de Jausiers
- Casernement de Barcelonette
- Casernement de Restefond
- Baraquement de Viraysse
- Baraquement des Fourches

Additionally, 36 concrete shelters were built by MOM in 1939 in the area.

== History ==
When Italy declared war on France on 10 June 1940, the French forces along the Alpine Line amounted to two corps constituting the Army of the Alps. They faced two poorly equipped Italian armies, the 1st and 4th. The northern portion of the SF Dauphiné around Briançon was held by elements of the French XVI Corps, while the southern, Ubaye district was held by XIV Corps. These formations faced the Italian Fourth Army.

=== Italian invasion of France ===
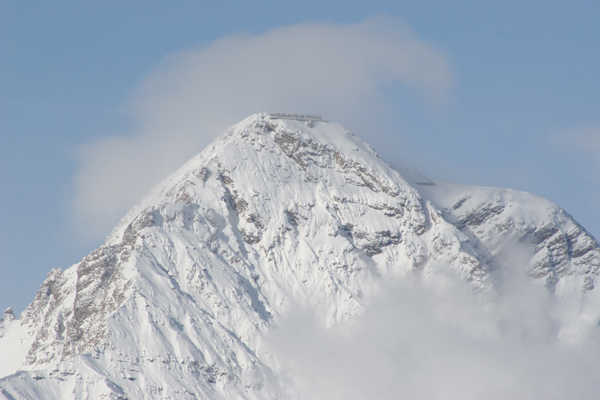
Mont Chaberton in winter from France, with Fort Chaberton visible at the summit

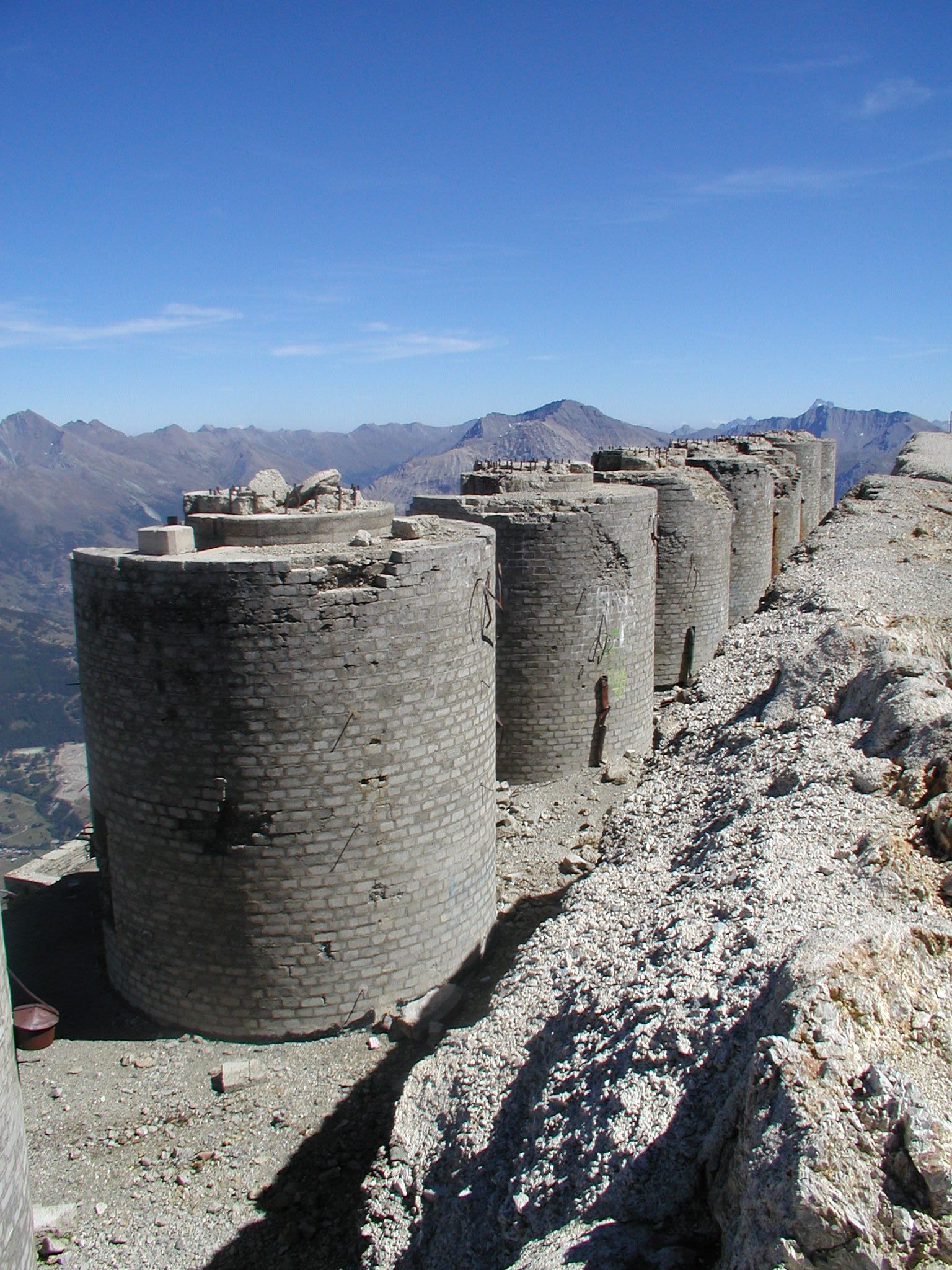
Artillery emplacements on Mont Chaberton

Actions in the Briançon area were focused on the threat posed by the mountaintop batteries at the Italian Fort Chaberton, armed with eight 149mm guns in turrets. On 17 June 1940, Chaberton opened fire on the Fort de l'Olive, with little effect. The next day, infantry pressure was applied around the Cleyda blockhouse, and fire was exchanged between Italian batteries and ouvrage Janus. By the 20th, Italian forces of the Assietta Division were infiltrating around Montgenèvre and Chaberton was firing on Janus, Gondran, les Aittes and Infernet, cutting electricity to Janus. Janus operated on local power while a battery of 280mm mortars of the 154th Position Artillery Regiment (154^{e} Régiment d'Artillerie de Position) was set up in two locations near Gondran and Infernet. Several columns of Italian infantry made probing attacks in the vicinity of Cerveyrette. On the 21st, Chaberton fired on Janus and Gondran, firing about 900 shells at Janus alone, causing moderate damage to the surface installations. However, the French mortar batteries were by this time in place. Fire from the heavy mortars damaged five of the eight Italian guns of Chaberton. The next day was relatively quiet, apart from some infantry infiltration by the Italian Sforzesca Division near the base of the Janus massif. Skirmishing took place on the 23rd, when the Italians captured the avant-poste Est du Chenaillet. Chaberton began firing again, receiving counter-battery fire from the French batteries in reply. The exchange continued the next day, and stopped only when the armistice took effect on the 25th, with six of eight Italian gun positions destroyed.

Farther south in the Queyras, the Italian Julia Division mounted weak probes without much success. In the Ubaye, the Italian 2nd Army Corps (2^{o} Corpo d'Armata) under General Bertini sought to move across the Col de Larche in Operation M (named for the Italian name of the pass, Colle della Maddalena). The corps was composed of five divisions: the 2nd Alpine Group (Raggrupamento Varaita-Po), and the Cuneense, Forli, Pusteria and Livorno Divisions. The principal activity took place, as expected, in the vicinity of the Col de Larche, starting on 17 June with infantry patrols that were engaged by the artillery of Roche-la-Croix, producing heavy Italian casualties. On the 20th the Observatoire de Viraysse was heavily bombarded, prompting retaliatory fire from Roche-la-Croix against Italian observation positions. The next day a strong column of Italians of the Acqui Division moving across the Col de Sautron and the Col des Monges to the Fort de Viraysse were turned back by field artillery fire. On the 22nd Italian artillery again concentrated on the Observatoire de Viraysse and the avant-post de Larche, again answered by Roche-la-Croix's 75mm gun turret. Other batteries took on a new advance over the Col des Monges. The Fort de Viraysse was encircled. Snow fell on the 23rd, but late that day the Italians launched an unsuccessful assault on the Fort de Viraysse. The bad weather continued on the 24th, but a sharp engagement on the Col Rémi and around Tête-Dure resulted in heavy Italian casualties and a number of prisoners.

The area around the Col de Restefond was subject to heavy snow, and had been unoccupied from October 1939 to mid-May 1940, when enough snow had cleared to allow the positions to be used and occupied. Apart from some skirmishing and artillery barrages, more decisive action was hampered by bad weather. Action in all areas stopped when the armistice took effect on 25 June. The Italians had failed to accomplish any significant penetration of the frontier, but German forces had come down the valley of the Rhône and were operating to the rear of the Alpine Line. Under the terms of the armistice, the frontier became a demilitarized zone, at least as far as French forces were concerned, 50 kilometres (31 mi) deep. It was nominally occupied by Italian forces, but the French forces had surrendered to the Germans.

==== Units ====
The 72nd Alpine Fortress Battalion was, on mobilization in 1939, the source of the 82nd, 92nd and 102nd BAFs, as the battalion's four companies grew in size. The battalion was stationed at Briançon at Fort du Randouillet and Fort Queyras. After mobilization the reorganized battalion held the Gondran-Aittes quarter, occupying ouvrages Janus, Gondran and Les Aittes. Interval troops held the crest of the Gondran massif and the road at Clôt Enjaime. In May 1940 the battalion took up its positions as soon as high-altitude snows permitted. The battalion saw action on 23 June against the Italian 30th Infantry Regiment at the avant-poste Chenaillet, losing 19 captured in foggy conditions. After the June 25 armistice the 72nd returned to Briançon, then moved on to the southeast of Gap, where it was dissolved on 31 July. Active-duty personnel were incorporated into the Vichy French bataillon départmental des Hautes-Alpes at Gap and a guard unit at Briançon.

=== 1944 ===
During the Occupation, the completed ouvrages had been provided with caretakers and were kept in good condition. With the Normandy landings, the French Resistance was instructed to impede German reinforcements from reaching northwest France by sabotaging the choke points through the Alps. The Petit Saint-Bernard, the Mont-Cenis and the Col de Larche were to be blocked. On 15 August 1944, the Operation Dragoon landings were accomplished by the Allies against light opposition. Briançon, which had been occupied by the German 5th Gebirgsjäger Division, was evacuated on 24 August and occupied by Resistance forces. However, the Germans remained in the surrounding fortresses, and the 90th Panzergrenadier Division mounted an unsuccessful counterattack against American patrols and French forces, operating from the Fort du Randouillet. The newly arrived 4th RTM and 3rd Moroccan under Colonel Molle mounted an offensive to drive the Germans over the Col de Montgenèvre starting on 4 September, and taking Gondran, Infernet, Croix-de-Bretagne, Chenaillet and Janus the same day. Randouillet and the Fort des Têtes were captured on the 6th, but German forces on the crest of the Col de Montgenèvre continued to fire into Briançon. The area around Les Fourches and Restfond was captured by French and American forces in late September, but was evacuated for the winter in October. The reactivated Fort Chaberton continued to fire on Briançon until it was captured in April 1945. Roche-la-Croix was captured by a new offensive on 22 April 1945. The next day Saint-Ours Haut and Bas were captured.

=== Post-War ===
As part of the Paris Peace Treaties of 1947, the Franco-Italian border was adjusted to place Mont Chaberton and the upper reaches of the Col de Larche in France. Nevertheless, the major Alpine positions remained operational, preserved until the 1970s when interest in expensive fixed fortifications had declined.

== Present status ==
Both Saint-Ours Haut and Saint-Ours Bas have been preserved and are available for tours by the public. Ouvrage Janus is owned by the Commune of Montgenèvre, and is being considered for public access. Many of the high-altitude positions are open to the elements.

The Vauban and Séré de Rivières-era fortifications around Briançon have been preserved, or remain military installations. The Vauban fortifications of Briançon have been designated Unesco World Heritage Sites.

== Bibliography ==
- Allcorn, William. The Maginot Line 1928-45. Oxford: Osprey Publishing, 2003. ISBN 1-84176-646-1
- Kaufmann, J.E. and Kaufmann, H.W. Fortress France: The Maginot Line and French Defenses in World War II, Stackpole Books, 2006. ISBN 0-275-98345-5
- Kaufmann, J.E., Kaufmann, H.W., Jancovič-Potočnik, A. and Lang, P. The Maginot Line: History and Guide, Pen and Sword, 2011. ISBN 978-1-84884-068-3
- Mary, Jean-Yves; Hohnadel, Alain; Sicard, Jacques. Hommes et Ouvrages de la Ligne Maginot, Tome 2. Paris, Histoire & Collections, 2001. ISBN 2-908182-97-1 (in French)
- Mary, Jean-Yves; Hohnadel, Alain; Sicard, Jacques. Hommes et Ouvrages de la Ligne Maginot, Tome 4 - La fortification alpine. Paris, Histoire & Collections, 2009. ISBN 978-2-915239-46-1 (in French)
- Mary, Jean-Yves; Hohnadel, Alain; Sicard, Jacques. Hommes et Ouvrages de la Ligne Maginot, Tome 5. Paris, Histoire & Collections, 2009. ISBN 978-2-35250-127-5 (in French)
