= Pointe Rochers Charniers =

Mountain in France

- Punta Rochers Charniers
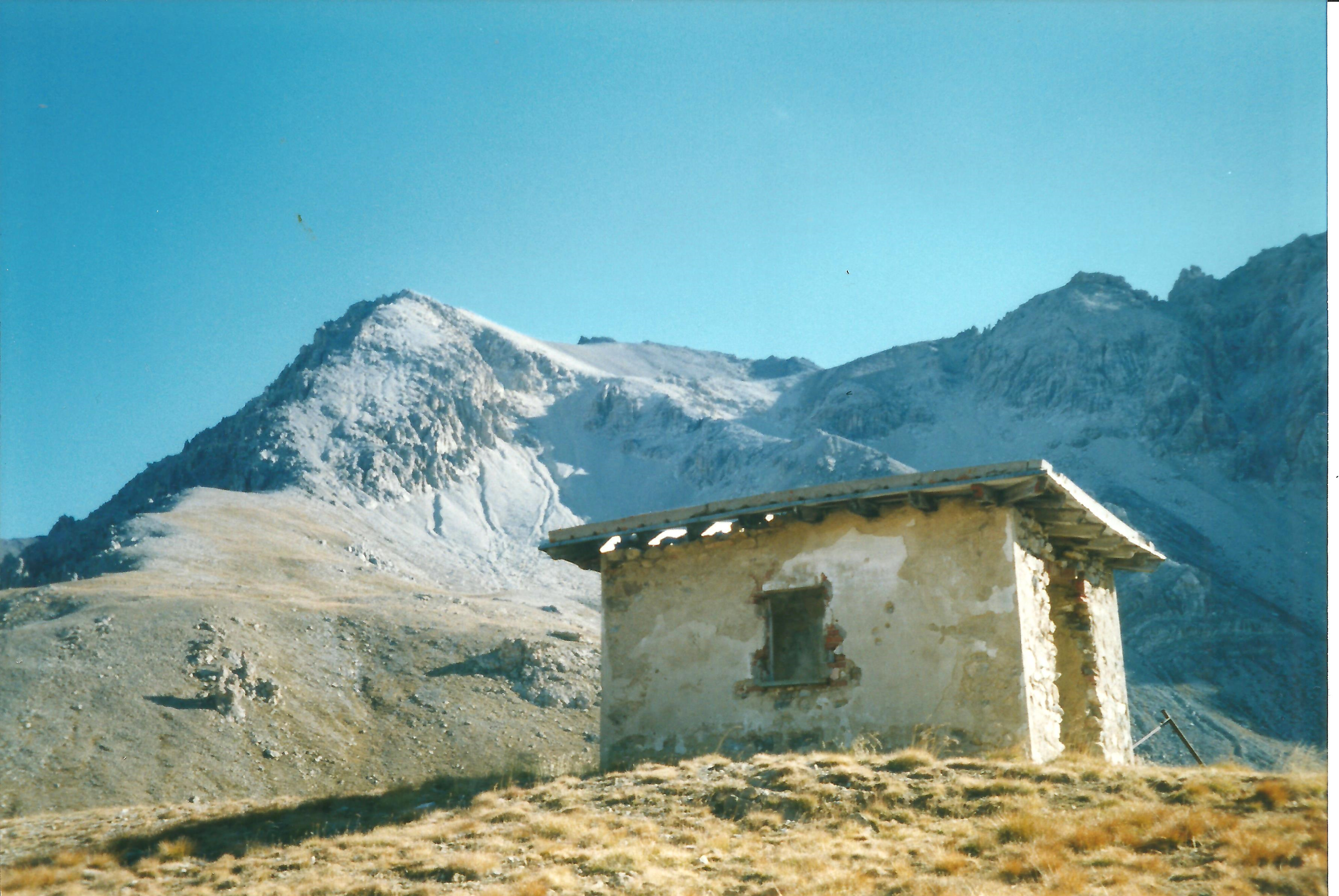
- View from the Col des Trois Frères Mineurs

Highest point
- Elevation: 3,063 m (10,049 ft)
- Prominence: 389 m (1,276 ft)
- Parent peak: Mont Chaberton
- Listing: Alpine mountains above 3000 m
- Coordinates: 44°59′15″N 6°44′07″E

Geography
- Location within France
- Location: Hautes-Alpes, France
- Parent range: Cottian Alps / / Massif des Cerces

Climbing
- Easiest route: Scrambling

The Pointe Rochers Charniers is a mountain of the Cottian Alps at an elevation of 3,063 metres above sea level, located in France.

== Toponymy ==
In French rochers means rocks. The meaning of charnier is mass grave; the name comes from a bloody battle between French and Spanish troops which took place close to the mountain. In Italian too the mountain is referred as Punta Rochers Charniers.

== Geography ==
The mountain is part of the main chain of the Alps where it marks the Dora-Durance water divide. The main ridge continues northwards with a saddle unnamed on the official French maps which divedes the Rochers Charniers from the Punta di Chalanche Ronde (or Pointe des Grands Becs). The main chain goes on towards South with the Crête des Charniers and the Col des Trois Frères Mineurs (2.586 m), rises up to the Pic du Lauzin (2,733 m) and goes down to the Col de Montgenèvre. A third ridge branches from the Rochers Charniers connecting it, through Col du Chaberton (2.674 m), with Mont Chaberton. According to French alpinistic literature the mountain is part of the Massif des Cerces, while in the SOIUSA (International Standardized Mountain Subdivision of the Alps) is part of the mountain group called "Gruppo del Chaberton"/"Groupe du Chaberton" in the Northern Cottian Alps.

== History ==
The mountain from 1861 to the end of the II World War was on the Franco-Italian border but, following the Paris Peace Treaties signed in February 1947, is now totally in France. The treaty indeed moved the border east of the Rocher Charniers in order to transfer to France the sovereignty of the neighbouring Mont Chaberton and its fortress. During the militarisation of the border and the construction of the Alpine Wallsome military installations were realised as a support to the Chaberton fortress. A military dirt road named Strada militare di Val Morino was also built on the eastern slopes of the Rochers Charniers, in order to connect cesana with the fortress.

== Access to the summit ==
From Claviere (Italy) or Montgenevre (Frane) the mountain is generally accessed through the Col des Trois Frères Mineurs. Is also possible to reach it from Prà Claud, a village in the comune of Cesana Torinese. The climb needs some scabbling and is advisable for experienced hikers (EE - escursionisti esperti). The Pointe des Rochers Charniers, when snow is stable, can also be accessed with a quite demanding ski mountaineering route; per l'accesso in sicurezza è necessaria la presenza di neve ben assestata.

== Maps ==
- French official cartography (Institut Géographique National - IGN); on-line version: www.geoportail.fr
- Istituto Geografico Centrale - Carta dei sentieri e dei rifugi scala 1:50.000 n. 1 Valli di Susa Chisone e Germanasca
