= Ouvrage La Moutière =

- Part of Maginot Line, Alpine Line
- Southeast France
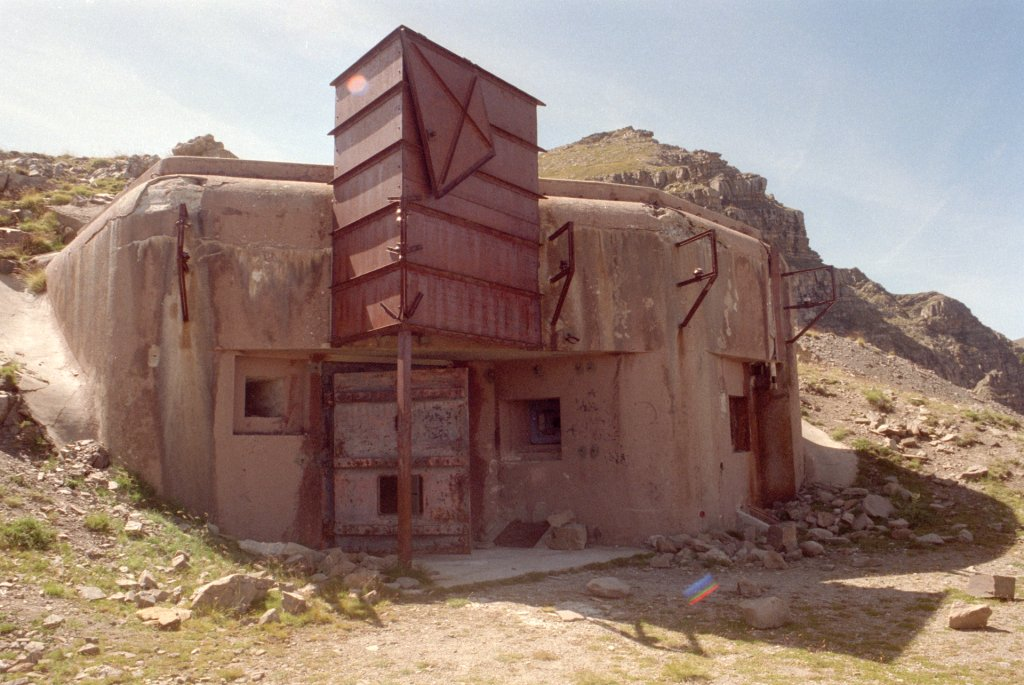
- La Moutière entry block with winter access shaft

Site information
- Controlled by: France

Location
- Coordinates: 44.31469°N 6.7959°E

Site history
- Built by: CORF
- In use: Abandoned
- Materials: Concrete, steel, rock excavation
- Battles/wars: Italian invasion of France

Ouvrage La Moutière is a lesser work (petit ouvrage) of the Maginot Line's Alpine extension, the Alpine Line at an altitude of 2440 meters. The ouvrage consists of one entry block, one infantry block and one observation block, with an unarmed exit block. The ouvrage supported the Ouvrage Restefond on the crest of the pass, guarding its southern flank. It also covered the Col de la Barcelonnette to the north. The position was built between 1931 and 1935.

== Description ==
See Fortified Sector of the Dauphiné for a broader discussion of the Dauphiné sector of the Alpine Line.

- Block 1 (entry): two machine gun embrasures. The block is equipped with a metal housing that functions as an access point when the winter snows cover the entrance.
- Block 2 (infantry block): one heavy twin machine gun embrasure.
- Block 3 (observation block): one machine gun cloche.
- Block 4 (emergency exit/exhaust): no armament.

The underground section of the ouvrage consists of three parallel galleries linked by a smaller passage.

A fortified barracks for La Moutière's garrison was established at a lower altitude inside a semi-buried abri or shelter. The area around the position retains the vestiges of firing positions constructed of dry stone masonry pierced by embrasures for guns. The fortification saw no action in either 1940 or 1944.

== See also ==
- List of Alpine Line ouvrages

== Bibliography ==
- Allcorn, William. The Maginot Line 1928–45. Oxford: Osprey Publishing, 2003. ISBN 1-84176-646-1
- Kaufmann, J.E. and Kaufmann, H.W. Fortress France: The Maginot Line and French Defenses in World War II, Stackpole Books, 2006. ISBN 0-275-98345-5
- Kaufmann, J.E., Kaufmann, H.W., Jancovič-Potočnik, A. and Lang, P. The Maginot Line: History and Guide, Pen and Sword, 2011. ISBN 978-1-84884-068-3
- Mary, Jean-Yves; Hohnadel, Alain; Sicard, Jacques. Hommes et Ouvrages de la Ligne Maginot, Tome 1. Paris, Histoire & Collections, 2001. ISBN 2-908182-88-2 (in French)
- Mary, Jean-Yves; Hohnadel, Alain; Sicard, Jacques. Hommes et Ouvrages de la Ligne Maginot, Tome 4 - La fortification alpine. Paris, Histoire & Collections, 2009. ISBN 978-2-915239-46-1 (in French)
- Mary, Jean-Yves; Hohnadel, Alain; Sicard, Jacques. Hommes et Ouvrages de la Ligne Maginot, Tome 5. Paris, Histoire & Collections, 2009. ISBN 978-2-35250-127-5 (in French)
