= Ouvrage Granges Communes =

Lesser work of the Alpine Line

- Part of Maginot Line, Alpine Line
- Southeast France
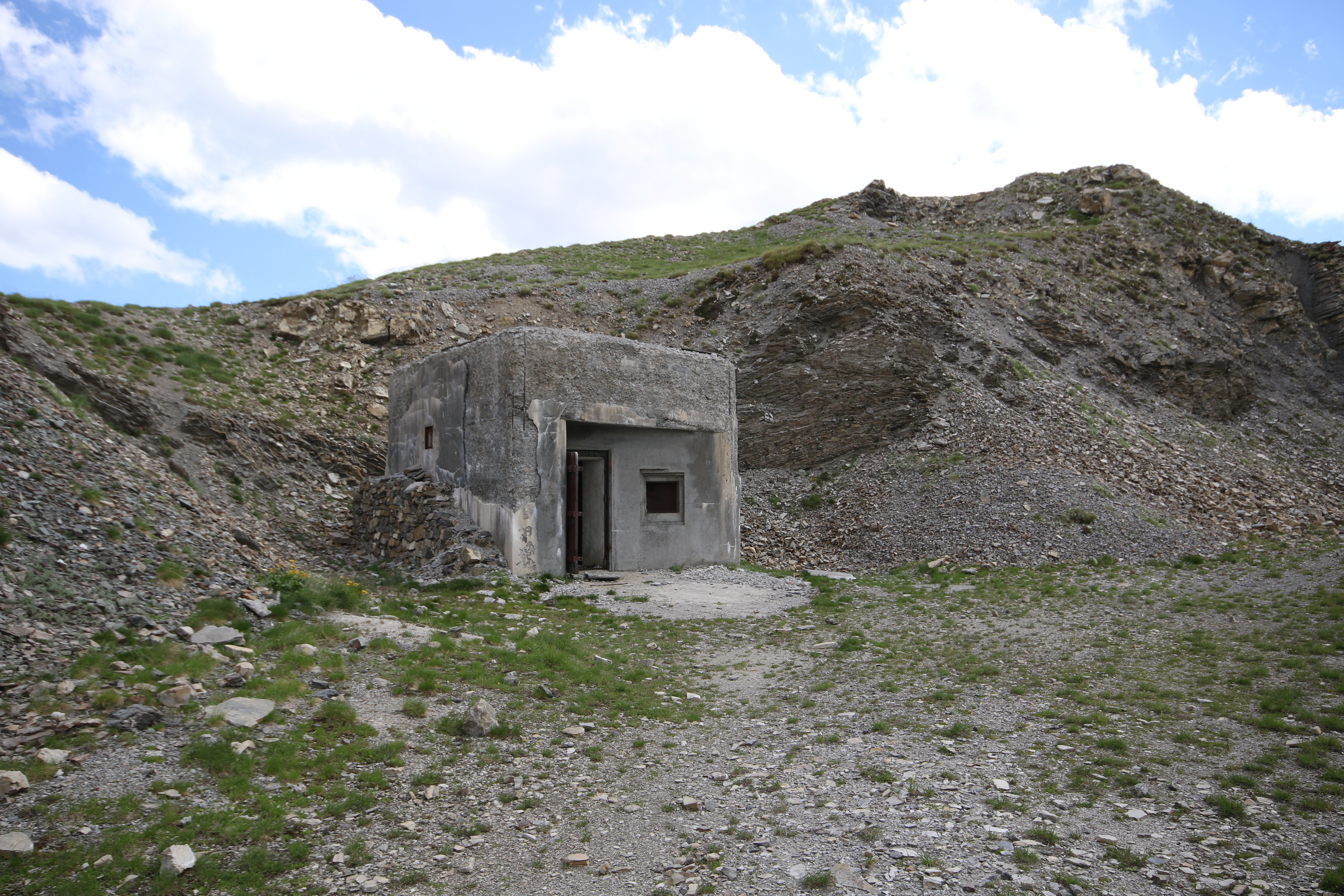

Site information
- Controlled by: France

Location
- Coordinates: 44.33846°N 6.83029°E

Site history
- Built by: CORF
- In use: Abandoned
- Materials: Concrete, steel, rock excavation
- Battles/wars: Battle of France

Ouvrage Granges Communes is a lesser work (petit ouvrage) of the Maginot Line's Alpine extension, the Alpine Line. The ouvrage consists of one infantry block facing Italy. Additional blocks were planned but not built. Granges Communes is located about four kilometers northeast of Ouvrage Restefond on the Col de Raspaillon (or the Col de Granges Communes) at an altitude of 2,525 metres (8,284 ft).

The position was placed to control the Col de Raspaillon road descending from the Camp des Fourches toward Bousiéyas. Construction began in 1931 and proceeded slowly due to design changes. By 1940 the entrance block remained uncompleted. The entrance block that presently exists was built in 1956 as part of a NATO policy of upgrading certain fortifications to block an advance by Warsaw Pact forces through northern Italy.

== Description ==
See Fortified Sector of the Dauphiné for a broader discussion of the Dauphiné sector of the Alpine Line.

- Block 1 (entry): one machine gun port, planned block largely unbuilt.
- Block 2 (infantry block): two machine gun cloches, two heavy twin machine gun cloches and two machine gun embrasures.

Additional blocks were planned but not built. The underground portions of the ouvrage consist of two parallel galleries containing the garrison's living quarters, magazine and supporting utilities. The fortifications are presently abandoned and open to the elements.

== See also ==
- List of Alpine Line ouvrages

== Bibliography ==
- Allcorn, William. The Maginot Line 1928-45. Oxford: Osprey Publishing, 2003. ISBN 1-84176-646-1
- Kaufmann, J.E. and Kaufmann, H.W. Fortress France: The Maginot Line and French Defenses in World War II, Stackpole Books, 2006. ISBN 0-275-98345-5
- Kaufmann, J.E., Kaufmann, H.W., Jancovič-Potočnik, A. and Lang, P. The Maginot Line: History and Guide, Pen and Sword, 2011. ISBN 978-1-84884-068-3
- Mary, Jean-Yves; Hohnadel, Alain; Sicard, Jacques. Hommes et Ouvrages de la Ligne Maginot, Tome 1. Paris, Histoire & Collections, 2001. ISBN 2-908182-88-2 (in French)
- Mary, Jean-Yves; Hohnadel, Alain; Sicard, Jacques. Hommes et Ouvrages de la Ligne Maginot, Tome 4 - La fortification alpine. Paris, Histoire & Collections, 2009. ISBN 978-2-915239-46-1 (in French)
- Mary, Jean-Yves; Hohnadel, Alain; Sicard, Jacques. Hommes et Ouvrages de la Ligne Maginot, Tome 5. Paris, Histoire & Collections, 2009. ISBN 978-2-35250-127-5 (in French)
