= Fort de l'Olive =

Fortification in Dauphiné, France

- Briançon, France
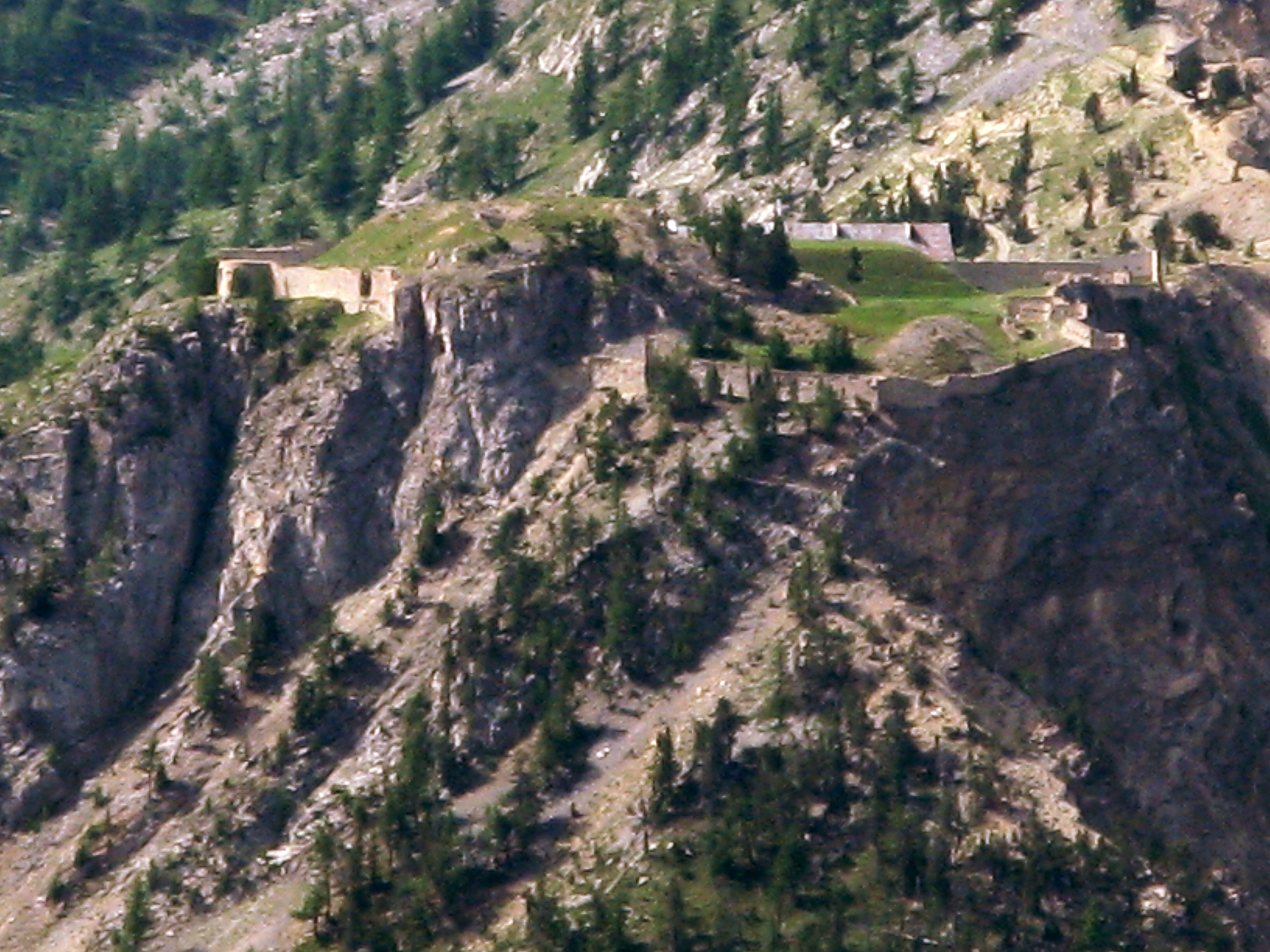
- Fort de l'Olive from the Aiguille Rouge

Site information
- Type: Fort
- Controlled by: France
- Condition: Abandoned

Location
- Coordinates: 44.9975°N 6.64611°E

Site history
- Built: 1881
- Battles/wars: Italian invasion of France

The Fort de l'Olive is a fortification in the vicinity of Briançon in the Dauphiné region of southeastern France. Built in 1881 it was originally called the Ouvrage du Bois des Gasquets, it was the third and final fort built near Briançon as part of the Séré de Rivières system of fortifications in the 1870s and 1880s.

== Location ==
Located at an altitude of 2,239 metres (7,346 ft), the Fort de l'Olive overlooked the valley of the Clarée above the village of Plampinet from a height of 800 metres (2,600 ft) with a view of the Italian frontier. It specifically controlled the Col de l'Echelle, the Col des Thures and the Col des Acles. The rectangular walled fort extends over an area of about 2.5 hectares (6.2 acres).

== History ==
The Fort de l'Olive was armed in the 1880s with fourteen 120mm guns. It was initially linked to the Fort de l'Infernet by optical telegraph, and later by telephone. A cableway provided a means of resupply from the valley below, particularly in the winter when road access was difficult. The Batterie du Lenlon was a subsidiary position, as was the Batterie du Sapey.

The fort was modernized in the 1930s with an infantry shelter or abri, known derisively as the Fort des Nuages (fort of the clouds), which was equipped with two casemates for guns. While being fired on by Chaberton in June 1940, the Fort de l'Olive in turn fired on the Italian fort Jaffereau in Bardonecchia.

The construction of Fort Chaberton on an even higher peak on the Italian side of the frontier rendered the Fort de l'Olive vulnerable to artillery from Chaberton, which was 900 metres (3,000 ft) higher. The position was used by the French Army in the defense of Briançon until 1940, when it was part of the Fortified Sector of the Dauphiné. The fort took artillery fire from Chaberton during the Italian invasion of France in 1940.

The site is abandoned but in good condition, and is freely accessible.
