= Fort du Randouillet =

- Briançon, France
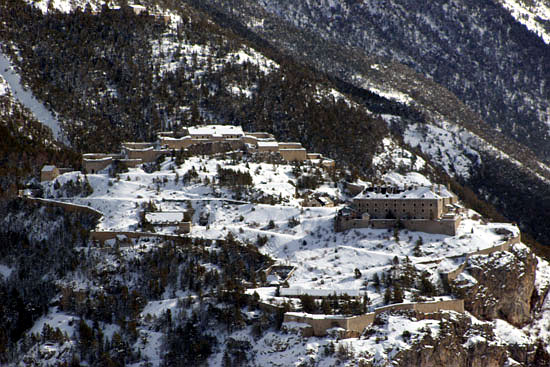
- Fort du Randouillet

Site information
- Type: Fort
- Owner: French Army
- Controlled by: France
- Open to the public: No
- Condition: Preserved

Location
- Coordinates: 44.88881°N 6.65292°E

Site history
- Built: 1724

The Fort du Randouillet, is a fortification in the vicinity of Briançon in the Dauphiné region of southeastern France. Briançon was surveyed by Vauban in 1692. His master plan for the defenses of the city would result in one of the most heavily fortified locales in France over the next forty years. Constructed to Vauban's plan between 1724 and 1734, the site was chosen to protect the lower Fort des Têtes from an enemy on the heights. The position was used by the French Army in the defense of Briançon until 1940, when it was part of the Fortified Sector of the Dauphiné.

The fort is composed of an armed citadel or donjon on the highest point, and a caserne on a lower shelf The Fort du Randouillet is linked to the Fort des Têtes by an enclosed, fortified gallery known as "Communication Y." A military aerial tram links the fort to the town, and another continued on to the Fort de l'Infernet.

The Fort du Randouillet, along with the Fort des Têtes and other military works of Briançon, was designated a UNESCO World Heritage Site in 2008, as part of a network of Vauban-related sites in testimony to Vauban's influence on military architecture and engineering.
