= Ouvrage Saint Ours Bas =

- Part of Maginot Line, Alpine Line
- Southeast France
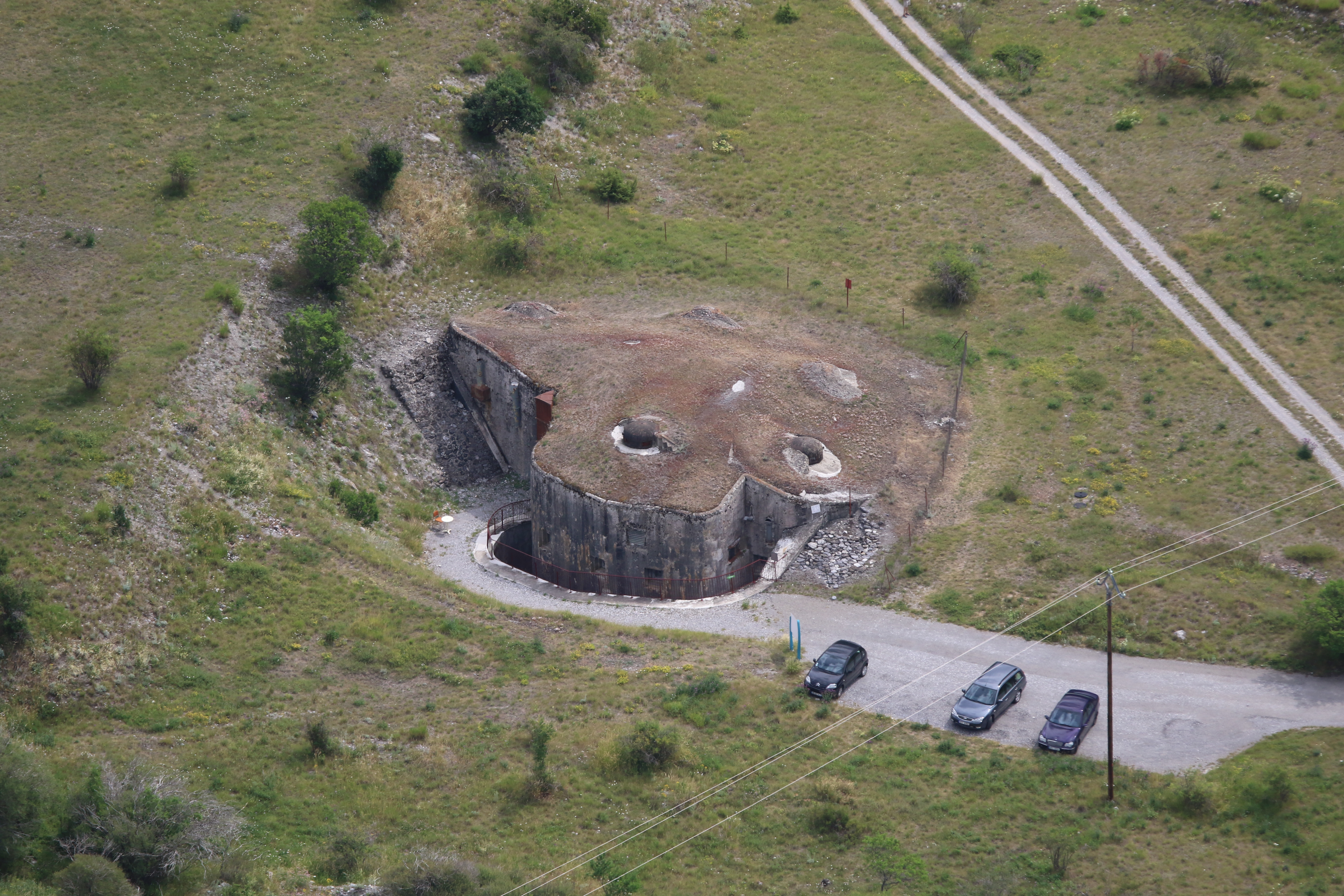

Site information
- Controlled by: France
- Open to the public: Yes

Location
- Coordinates: 44.47133°N 6.80881°E

Site history
- Built by: CORF
- In use: Preserved
- Materials: Concrete, steel
- Battles/wars: Italian invasion of France

Ouvrage Saint Ours Bas is a lesser work (petit ouvrage) of the Maginot Line's Alpine extension, the Alpine Line. The ouvrage consists of one infantry block. The location is unusual in lacking the underground galleries typical of a Maginot fortification, making it more like a blockhouse than an ouvrage. It was armed with two machine gun cloches and three heavy twin machine guns and six light machine gun embrasures. The interior is laid out on two levels.

Construction began in July 1931, and cost 4.2 million francs to complete. The position controlled movement along RN 100.

See Fortified Sector of the Dauphiné for a broader discussion of the Dauphiné sector of the Alpine Line.

== Present condition ==
Saint-Ours Bas has been preserved and is now a museum, associated with Ouvrage Saint Ours Haut, as part of the Museum of Saint-Ours-Bas.

== See also ==
- List of Alpine Line ouvrages

== Bibliography ==
- Allcorn, William. The Maginot Line 1928-45. Oxford: Osprey Publishing, 2003. ISBN 1-84176-646-1
- Kaufmann, J.E. and Kaufmann, H.W. Fortress France: The Maginot Line and French Defenses in World War II, Stackpole Books, 2006. ISBN 0-275-98345-5
- Kaufmann, J.E., Kaufmann, H.W., Jancovič-Potočnik, A. and Lang, P. The Maginot Line: History and Guide, Pen and Sword, 2011. ISBN 978-1-84884-068-3
- Mary, Jean-Yves; Hohnadel, Alain; Sicard, Jacques. Hommes et Ouvrages de la Ligne Maginot, Tome 1. Paris, Histoire & Collections, 2001. ISBN 2-908182-88-2 (in French)
- Mary, Jean-Yves; Hohnadel, Alain; Sicard, Jacques. Hommes et Ouvrages de la Ligne Maginot, Tome 4 - La fortification alpine. Paris, Histoire & Collections, 2009. ISBN 978-2-915239-46-1 (in French)
- Mary, Jean-Yves; Hohnadel, Alain; Sicard, Jacques. Hommes et Ouvrages de la Ligne Maginot, Tome 5. Paris, Histoire & Collections, 2009. ISBN 978-2-35250-127-5 (in French)
