= Ouvrage Les Aittes =

- Part of Maginot Line, Alpine Line
- Southeast France
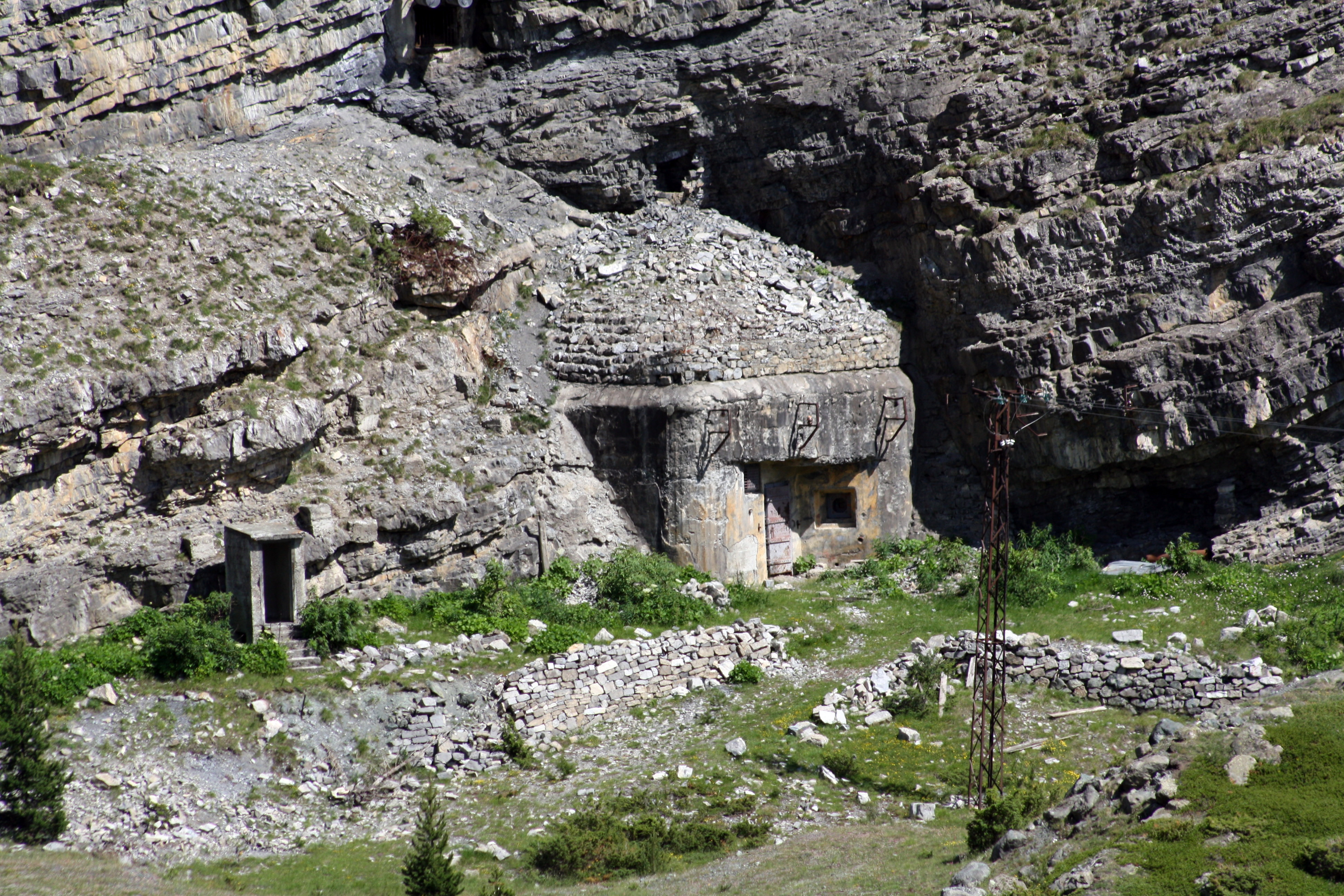

Site information
- Controlled by: France
- Open to the public: By arrangement

Location
- Coordinates: 44.87624°N 6.74507°E

Site history
- Built by: CORF
- In use: Preserved
- Materials: Concrete, steel, rock excavation
- Battles/wars: Italian invasion of France

Ouvrage Les Aittes is a lesser work (petit ouvrage) of the Maginot Line's Alpine extension, the Alpine Line. The ouvrage consists of one entry block, three infantry blocks and one observation block, about two kilometers east of Cervières, Hautes-Alpes at an altitude of 2,029 metres (6,657 ft)..

== Description ==
See Fortified Sector of the Dauphiné for a broader discussion of the Dauphiné sector of the Alpine Line.

Construction of Les Aittes started in 1932, with work continuing until 1937, under the direction of the Main d'Oeuvre Militaire (MOM). The ouvrage was excavated directly from the rock, with no concreted galleries, the longest extending 215 metres (705 ft) from the entrance to Block 2.

- Block 1 (entry): one machine gun embrasure.
- Block 2 (infantry): one machine gun embrasure.
- Block 3 (infantry): one heavy twin machine gun embrasure.
- Block 4 (infantry): one heavy twin machine gun embrasure.

In June 1940 the position was commanded by Lieutenant Renon, with 92 men.

Les Aittes is owned by the commune of Cervières, and may be visited by arrangement.

== See also ==
- List of Alpine Line ouvrages

== Bibliography ==
- Allcorn, William. The Maginot Line 1928-45. Oxford: Osprey Publishing, 2003. ISBN 1-84176-646-1
- Kaufmann, J.E. and Kaufmann, H.W. Fortress France: The Maginot Line and French Defenses in World War II, Stackpole Books, 2006. ISBN 0-275-98345-5
- Kaufmann, J.E., Kaufmann, H.W., Jancovič-Potočnik, A. and Lang, P. The Maginot Line: History and Guide, Pen and Sword, 2011. ISBN 978-1-84884-068-3
- Mary, Jean-Yves; Hohnadel, Alain; Sicard, Jacques. Hommes et Ouvrages de la Ligne Maginot, Tome 1. Paris, Histoire & Collections, 2001. ISBN 2-908182-88-2 (in French)
- Mary, Jean-Yves; Hohnadel, Alain; Sicard, Jacques. Hommes et Ouvrages de la Ligne Maginot, Tome 4 - La fortification alpine. Paris, Histoire & Collections, 2009. ISBN 978-2-915239-46-1 (in French)
- Mary, Jean-Yves; Hohnadel, Alain; Sicard, Jacques. Hommes et Ouvrages de la Ligne Maginot, Tome 5. Paris, Histoire & Collections, 2009. ISBN 978-2-35250-127-5 (in French)
