= Ouvrage Janus =

- Part of Maginot Line, Alpine Line
- Southeast France
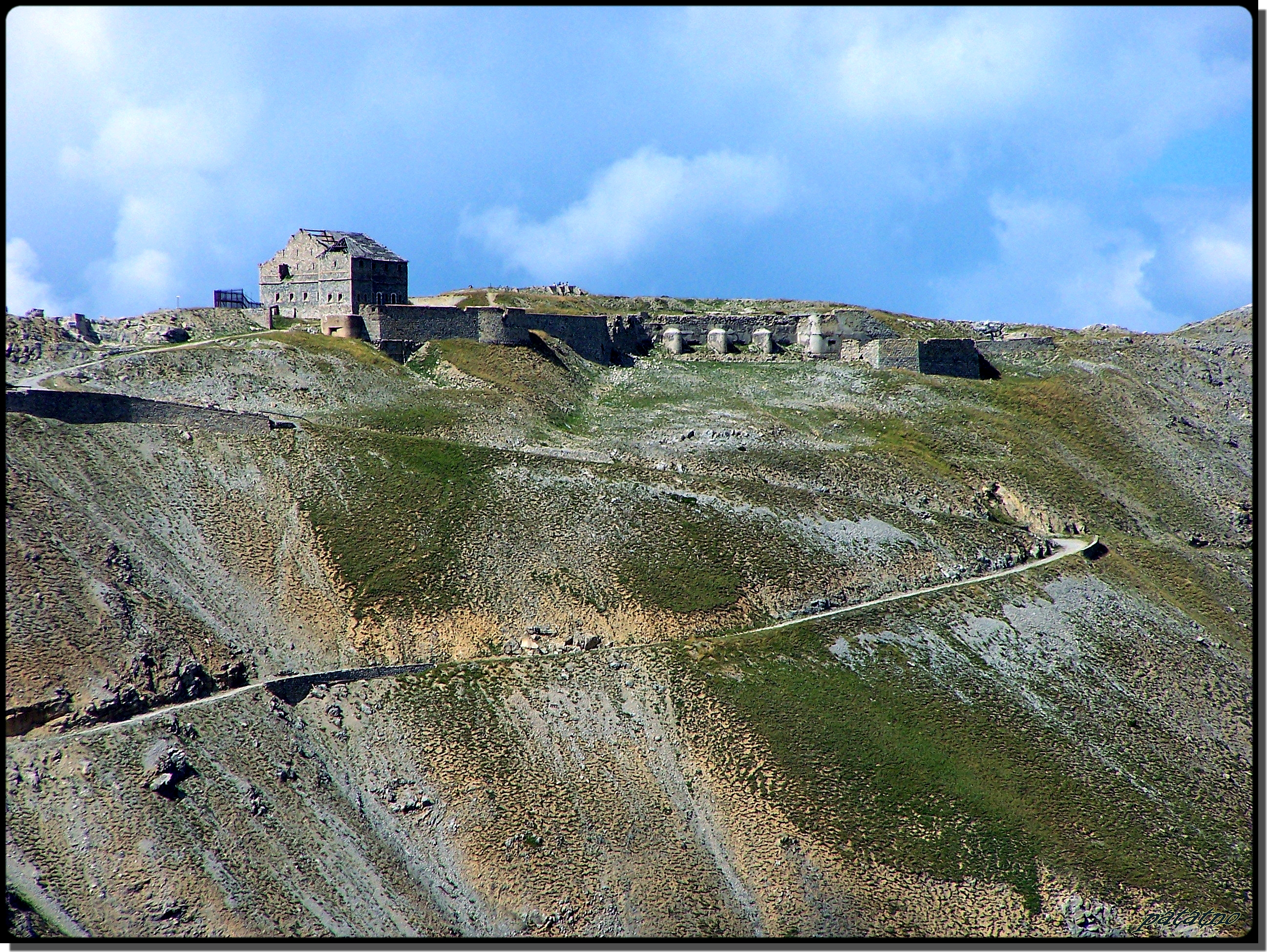

Site information
- Owner: Montgenèvre
- Controlled by: France
- Open to the public: Under study

Location
- Location within France
- Coordinates: 44.8929°N 6.747°E

Site history
- Built by: CORF
- In use: Preserved
- Materials: Concrete, steel, rock excavation
- Battles/wars: Italian invasion of France

Ouvrage Janus is a work (gros ouvrage) of the Maginot Line's Alpine extension, the Alpine Line, located to the east of Briançon on near the Col de Montgenèvre. The ouvrage consists of one entry block, two infantry blocks, two artillery blocks, two observation blocks and one combination block at an altitude of 2,540 metres (8,330 ft), the second highest fortification on the Alps in 1940. Built on the site of the old Fort Janus, it retained the old fort's 95mm naval guns and added two 75mm guns.

== Fort du Janus ==
The location was known from the end of the 18th century as the Château Jouan, occupied by a Vauban-era round tower. In 1883 a Séré de Rivières system fortification was begun on the massif, called the Fort du Janus. Work continued until 1889 with a blockhouse in top of the position and a rock-cut battery in the face of the mountain, which housed four 95mm naval guns. In 1891-92 the blockhouse was expanded to two levels for a barracks, and from 1898 to 1906 a subterranean barracks was excavated. The whole was surrounded by a perimeter wall. The fort was armed with six guns on the ramparts in addition to the four naval guns in their unique casemate, which was added between 1898 and 1906. The garrison was 120 men. The perimeter was laid out with re-entrant angles to sweep the walls with fields of fire.

The underground component comprised three large chambers, a cistern with a capacity of 100 cubic meters of water, a kitchen, a small magazine and a connection to the 95mm gun casemate. The gun positions were separated by prominent buttresses to prevent fragments from affecting the entire battery, and each gun was provided with an exhaust hood for gun fumes. The 95mm battery provided flanking fire to the Gondran line on the Montgenèvre massif.

== Ouvrage du Janus ==
Given the existing facilities and the site's strategic importance, the site was selected for a Maginot ouvrage in 1926. Work began in 1931, abandoning some of the older work and creating new underground facilities to the Maginot Line standard. A gallery connected the new position to the Séré de Rivières works. Work stopped in July 1935 as a result of the Stresa Front agreement with Italy, but restarted in 1938 as relations with Italy and Germany deteriorated. The cost of the new work amounted to 10.3 million francs (not including armament). When the position was occupied in 1938, numerous deficiencies in heat, ventilation and optical sighting equipment were uncovered.

The Maginot ouvrage incorporates subterranean elements of the old fort, particularly the entry and underground barracks. New galleries were extended to the ends of the rock fin to Blocks 4, 5, 6 and 7 on the north and blocks 1 and 2 on the south. The massive Block 8 inherited from the original fort occupies the center of the ridge, facing southeast.

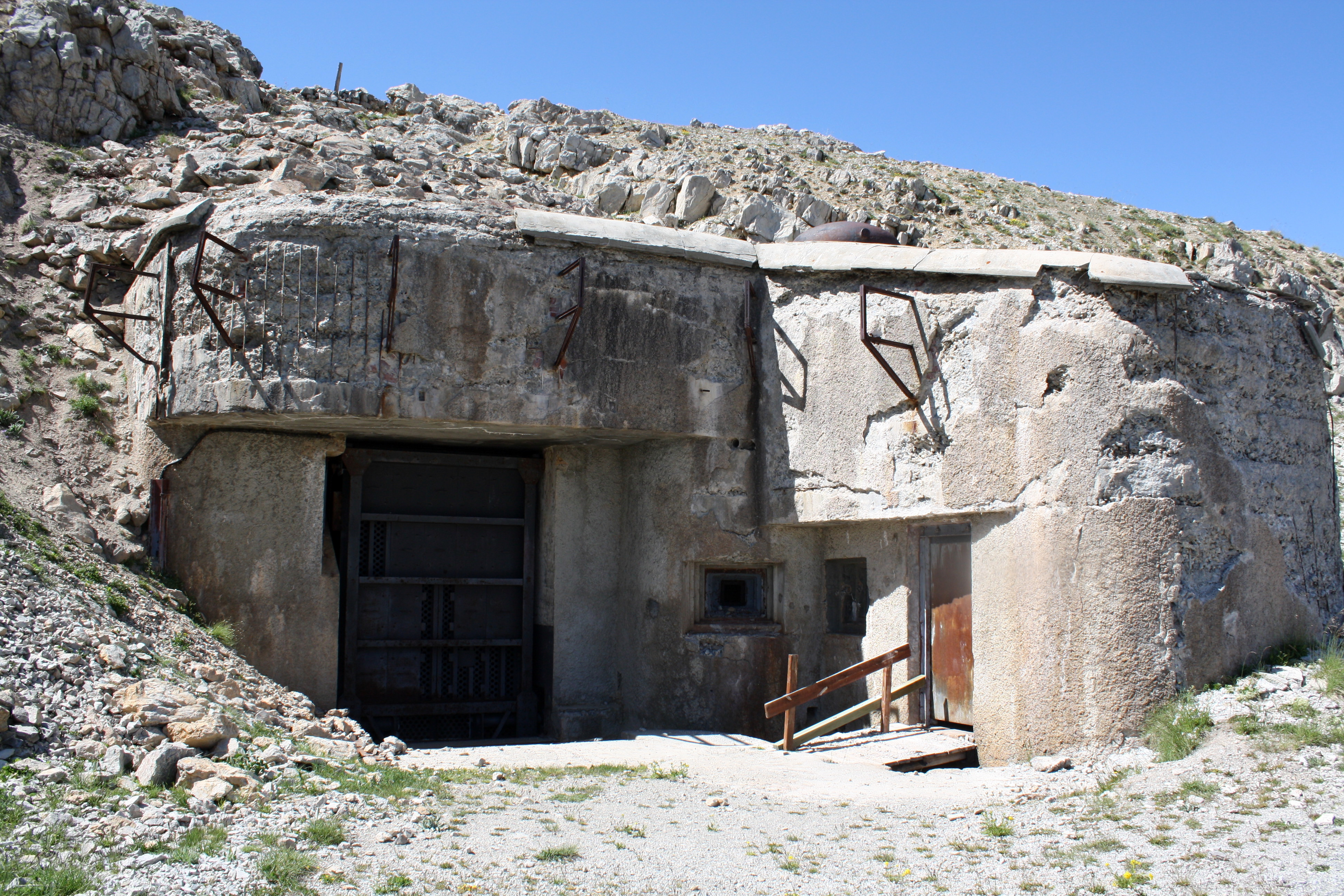
Entrance

== Description ==
- Block 1 (entry): one machine gun embrasure and one heavy machine gun/47mm anti-tank gun embrasure.
- Block 2 (artillery): two heavy twin machine gun cloches and two 81mm mortar embrasures.
- Block 3 (artillery): two 75mm gun embrasures.
- Block 4 (observation): one observation cloche and one machine gun embrasure.
- Block 5 (observation): no armament.
- Block 6 (infantry): one heavy twin machine gun cloche.
- Block 7 (infantry): one heavy twin machine gun cloche.
- Block 8 (artillery): four 95mm naval guns, incorporated from the earlier fort.

== History ==
See Fortified Sector of the Dauphiné for a broader discussion of the Dauphiné sector of the Alpine Line.

On 19 June 1940 the ouvrage was fired upon by the 149mm guns of the Italian Fort Chaberton, 600 metres (2,000 ft) higher in altitude. The bombardment continued the next day and on the 21st, with significant damage to the surface installations and the 95mm gun embrasures. The 6th Battery of the 154th Régiment d'Artillerie de Position, armed with four 280mm mortars, established dispersed positions and opened fire on 21 June, guided by observers at Janus, and silencing the Chaberton guns. On 23 and 24 June Janus fired on Italian positions, with continued heavy French mortar fire directed at Chaberton. Janus's commanding officer altered the guns' shields to open a broader line of fire against the Col de Montgenèvre. The armistice of 25 June brought fighting to an end.

After the 1940 armistice, Italian forces occupied the Alpine ouvrages and disarmed them. In August 1943, southern France was occupied by the German 19th Army, which took over many of the Alpine positions that had been occupied by the Italians until Italy's withdrawal from the war in September 1943.

Janus was recaptured by Free French forces on 4 September 1944. Immediately after the war, the Briançon region was regarded as an area of medium priority for restoration and reuse by the military. By the 1950s the positions in the Southeast of France were restored and operational again. However, by 1960, with France's acquisition of nuclear weapons, the cost and effectiveness of the Maginot system was called into question. Between 1964 and 1971 nearly all of the Maginot fortifications were deactivated.

The site is presently owned by Montgenèvre and is under study for public access. The above-ground portion of the site is unsecured. Damage from the 1940 Italian bombardment has not been repaired. The Maginot positions are closed to access.

== See also ==
- List of Alpine Line ouvrages

== Bibliography ==
- Allcorn, William. The Maginot Line 1928-45. Oxford: Osprey Publishing, 2003. ISBN 1-84176-646-1
- Kaufmann, J.E. and Kaufmann, H.W. Fortress France: The Maginot Line and French Defenses in World War II, Stackpole Books, 2006. ISBN 0-275-98345-5
- Kaufmann, J.E., Kaufmann, H.W., Jancovič-Potočnik, A. and Lang, P. The Maginot Line: History and Guide, Pen and Sword, 2011. ISBN 978-1-84884-068-3
- Marquilie, Franck, le fort du Janus, aboutissement de 250 ans de fortification dans le Briançonnais, éditions Atelier Rankki, 200 p., 2012, ISBN 978-2-9544873-0-4 (in French)
- Mary, Jean-Yves; Hohnadel, Alain; Sicard, Jacques. Hommes et Ouvrages de la Ligne Maginot, Tome 4 - La fortification alpine. Paris, Histoire & Collections, 2009. ISBN 978-2-915239-46-1 (in French)
- Mary, Jean-Yves; Hohnadel, Alain; Sicard, Jacques. Hommes et Ouvrages de la Ligne Maginot, Tome 5. Paris, Histoire & Collections, 2009. ISBN 978-2-35250-127-5 (in French)
