= Fort des Têtes =

Fortification in Briançon, Dauphiné, southeast France

- Briançon, France
- Aerial view of Fort des Têtes with the old town of Briançon in the background

Site information
- Type: Fort
- Owner: French Army
- Controlled by: France
- Condition: Preserved

Location
- Location within France
- Coordinates: 44.89528°N 6.65°E

Site history
- Built: 1721

The Fort des Têtes, also known as the Fort des Trois Têtes, is a fortification in the vicinity of Briançon in the Dauphiné region of southeastern France. Partially designed by Vauban, the fort was first established as a permanent fortification in the 1720s and was used by the French army until 1940. Owing to its testimony to the advancement of military fortifications and Vauban's influence in military architecture, it was listed as a UNESCO World Heritage Site in 2008.

== History ==
It was first surveyed by Vauban in 1700. In 1709 the Marshal Berwick established a fortified camp on the plateau, overlooking the valley of the Durance from a height of 1,440 metres (4,720 ft). The position controlled the high valleys of Fontenil and Fontchristiane. A permanent bastioned triangular fort was built between 1721 and 1723 to designs by Tardif and Nègre. The position was used by the French Army in the defense of Briançon until 1940, when it was part of the Fortified Sector of the Dauphiné.

== Description ==
The fort is connected to the main town by the Pont d'Asfeld, designed by Vauban. The fort has three principal frontages and a lower fort covering the approaches. The garrison comprised about 1,250 men serving 70 artillery pieces. The Fort des Trois-Têtes is linked to the nearby Fort du Randouillet by an enclosed, fortified gallery known as "Communication Y". In the 1880s two ammunition magazines were excavated, one within the rock, the other trenched and covered with earth.

== World Heritage Site ==
The Fort des Têtes, along with Communication Y, the Fort du Randouillet and other military works of Briançon, was designated a Unesco World Heritage Site in 2008, as part of a network of Vauban-related sites.
