= Ouvrage Gondran =

- Part of Maginot Line, Alpine Line
- Southeast France
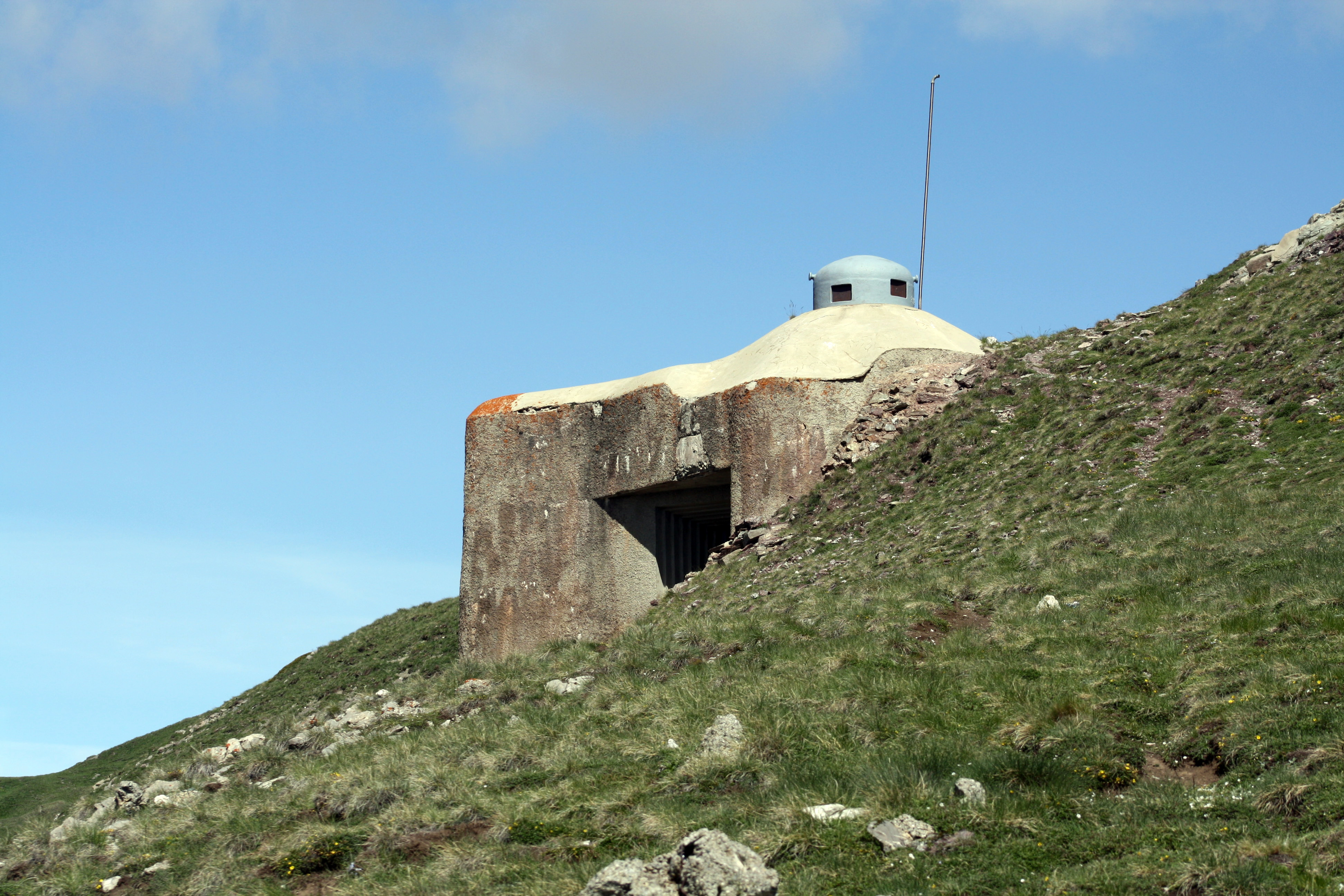

Site information
- Controlled by: France
- Open to the public: Occasionally

Location
- Coordinates: 44.89196°N 6.72096°E

Site history
- Built by: CORF
- In use: Preserved
- Materials: Concrete, steel, rock excavation
- Battles/wars: Italian invasion of France

Garrison information
- Garrison: 43

Ouvrage Gondran is a lesser work (petit ouvrage) of the Maginot Line's Alpine extension, the Alpine Line. The ouvrage consists of one entry block, one infantry block and one observation block. Gondran was commenced in June 1933, and was intended to cover the gap between Janus and Les Aittes. The site is close to two older forts, designated Gondran C and Gondran D. The Maginot fortification became known as Gondran E.

The fortified area is near the Les Gondrans portion of the Montgenèvre ski area.

== Description ==
See Fortified Sector of the Dauphiné for a broader discussion of the Dauphiné sector of the Alpine Line.

The ouvrage was never completed. As the emergency exit was on the same level as the main portion it was used during peacetime as the main entrance. It is sometimes called "Gondran E."

- Block 1 (entry): one machine gun cloche and one heavy twin machine gun embrasure.
- Block 2 (infantry): one machine gun embrasure.
- Block 3 (observation): one observation cloche.

== Fort Gondran ==
Fort Gondran is the center of a series of high-altitude fortifications in the area of Montgenevre, built between 1885 and 1910. The positions were anchored by the main fort, also known as Gondran C 44°53′30.58″N 06°42′49.73″E, with smaller positions designated Gondran A, B and D, extending in a line roughly 1,800 metres (5,900 ft) long. The positions were occupied by 800 men, and were known as the "Gondran line."

- Gondran A: small infantry position with a breastwork wall shielding the barracks.
- Gondran B: small infantry position similar to Gondran A.
- Gondran C: Stone fort at 2,459 metres (8,068 ft) altitude, housing 288 men. Also known as Fort Gondran, built 1887-1890.
- Gondran D: Stone redoubt, built 1875 500 metres (1,600 ft) south of Gondran C. The redoubt is now used for telecommunications equipment.

== Action ==
On 18 June 1940 the ouvrage was fired upon by the then Italian Fort on Mont Chaberton.

== Present condition ==
Gondran is managed by the Association de Vauban à Maginot, which opens it a few days each year, including Bastille Day.

== See also ==
- List of Alpine Line ouvrages

== Bibliography ==
- Allcorn, William. The Maginot Line 1928-45. Oxford: Osprey Publishing, 2003. ISBN 1-84176-646-1
- Kaufmann, J.E. and Kaufmann, H.W. Fortress France: The Maginot Line and French Defenses in World War II, Stackpole Books, 2006. ISBN 0-275-98345-5
- Kaufmann, J.E., Kaufmann, H.W., Jancovič-Potočnik, A. and Lang, P. The Maginot Line: History and Guide, Pen and Sword, 2011. ISBN 978-1-84884-068-3
- Mary, Jean-Yves; Hohnadel, Alain; Sicard, Jacques. Hommes et Ouvrages de la Ligne Maginot, Tome 4 - La fortification alpine. Paris, Histoire & Collections, 2009. ISBN 978-2-915239-46-1 (in French)
- Mary, Jean-Yves; Hohnadel, Alain; Sicard, Jacques. Hommes et Ouvrages de la Ligne Maginot, Tome 5. Paris, Histoire & Collections, 2009. ISBN 978-2-35250-127-5 (in French)
