= Ouvrage Restefond =

- Part of Maginot Line, Alpine Line
- Southeast France
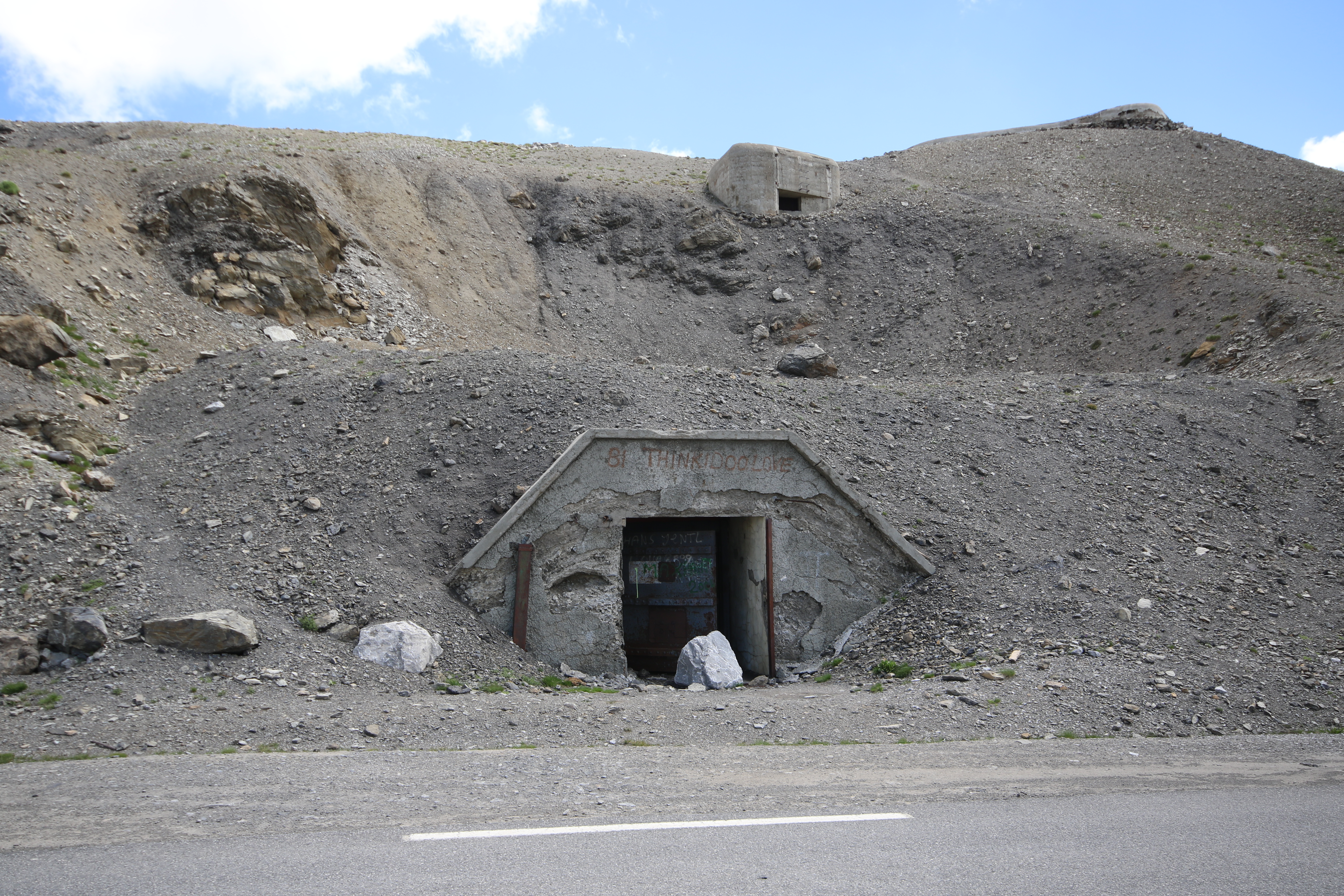

Site information
- Controlled by: France

Location
- Coordinates: 44.33028°N 6.80889°E

Site history
- Built by: CORF
- In use: Abandoned
- Materials: Concrete, steel, rock excavation
- Battles/wars: Italian invasion of France

Ouvrage Restefond is a work (gros ouvrage) of the Maginot Line's Alpine extension, the Alpine Line. The ouvrage consists of one artillery block and three observation blocks at the summit of the Col de la Bonette. The entry block and an artillery block were not completed, and a further block was never built. At 2,733 metres (8,967 ft), Restefond is the highest Maginot ouvrage.

== Description ==
- Block 1 (unfinished entry): one machine gun cloche and one heavy twin machine gun embrasure. A 47mm anti-tank gun was planned.
- Block 2 (infantry block): one machine gun cloche and two 81mm mortar embrasures.
- Block 3 (infantry block): one machine gun cloche and one heavy twin machine gun embrasure.
- Block 4 (infantry block): one observation cloche, one machine gun cloche and one heavy twin machine gun embrasure.
- Block 5 (uncompleted artillery block): three 75mm gun embrasures.
- Block 6 (artillery block): three 75mm gun embrasures, intended primarily for indirect fire.
- Block 7 (unbuilt): three 75mm gun embrasures, later proposed to be armed with a twin 75mm gun turret.

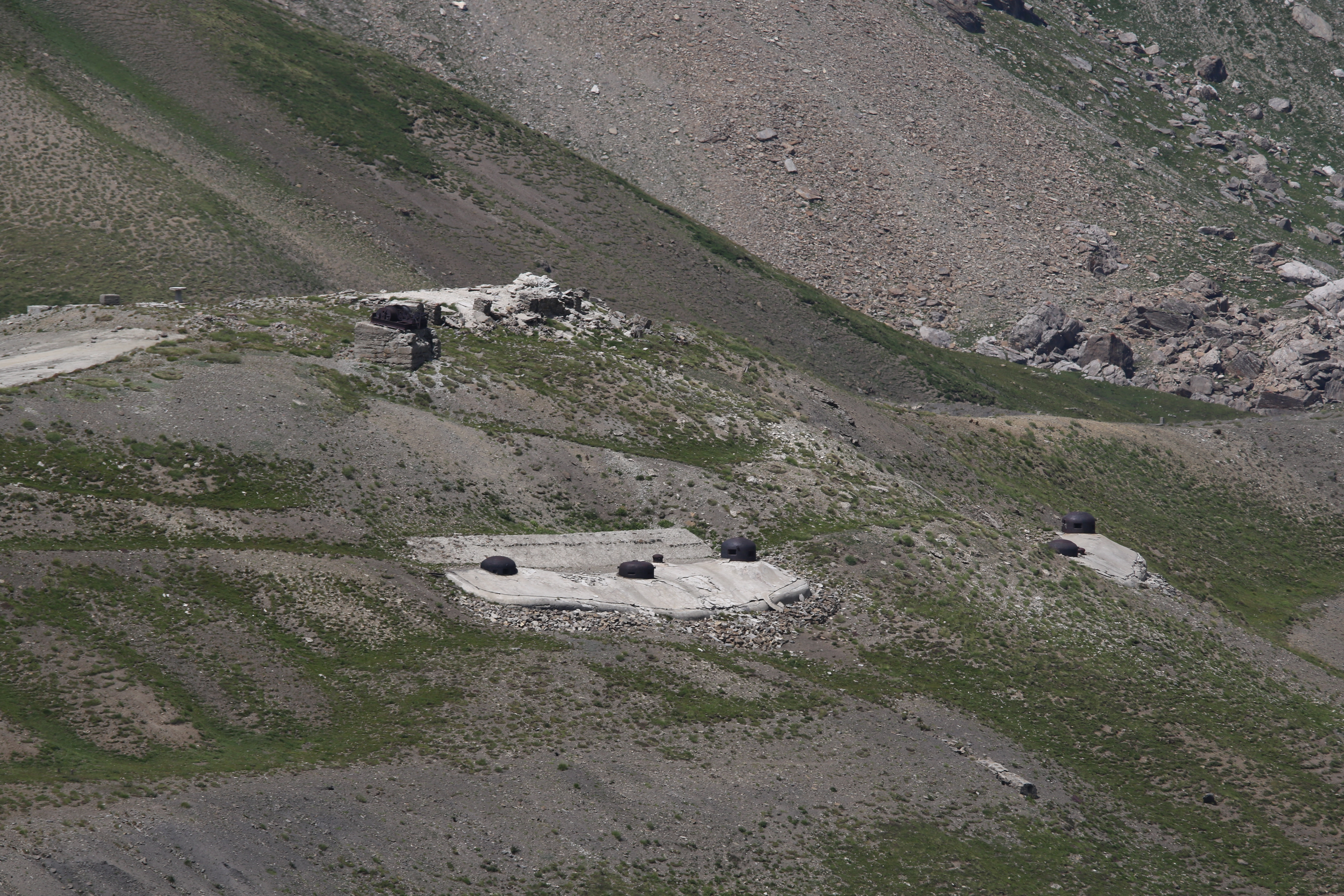
General view of Restefond

Restefond includes 668 meters of underground galleries at a depth of 64 meters. The position remains the property of the French military, with much of its equipment intact. Some of the uninstalled equipment remains at the Restefond barracks nearby.

== 1940 ==
See Fortified Sector of the Dauphiné for a broader discussion of the Dauphiné sector of the Alpine Line.

Block 6 fired on Italian forces in June 1940 as they advanced toward the Col des Fourches.

== See also ==
- List of Alpine Line ouvrages

== Bibliography ==
- Allcorn, William. The Maginot Line 1928-45. Oxford: Osprey Publishing, 2003. ISBN 1-84176-646-1
- Kaufmann, J.E. and Kaufmann, H.W. Fortress France: The Maginot Line and French Defenses in World War II, Stackpole Books, 2006. ISBN 0-275-98345-5
- Kaufmann, J.E., Kaufmann, H.W., Jancovič-Potočnik, A. and Lang, P. The Maginot Line: History and Guide, Pen and Sword, 2011. ISBN 978-1-84884-068-3
- Mary, Jean-Yves; Hohnadel, Alain; Sicard, Jacques. Hommes et Ouvrages de la Ligne Maginot, Tome 1. Paris, Histoire & Collections, 2001. ISBN 2-908182-88-2 (in French)
- Mary, Jean-Yves; Hohnadel, Alain; Sicard, Jacques. Hommes et Ouvrages de la Ligne Maginot, Tome 4 - La fortification alpine. Paris, Histoire & Collections, 2009. ISBN 978-2-915239-46-1 (in French)
- Mary, Jean-Yves; Hohnadel, Alain; Sicard, Jacques. Hommes et Ouvrages de la Ligne Maginot, Tome 5. Paris, Histoire & Collections, 2009. ISBN 978-2-35250-127-5 (in French)
