= Fort de l'Infernet =

Fortification complex near Briançon, French

- Part of Alpine Line (backup), Séré de Rivières system
- Southeast France
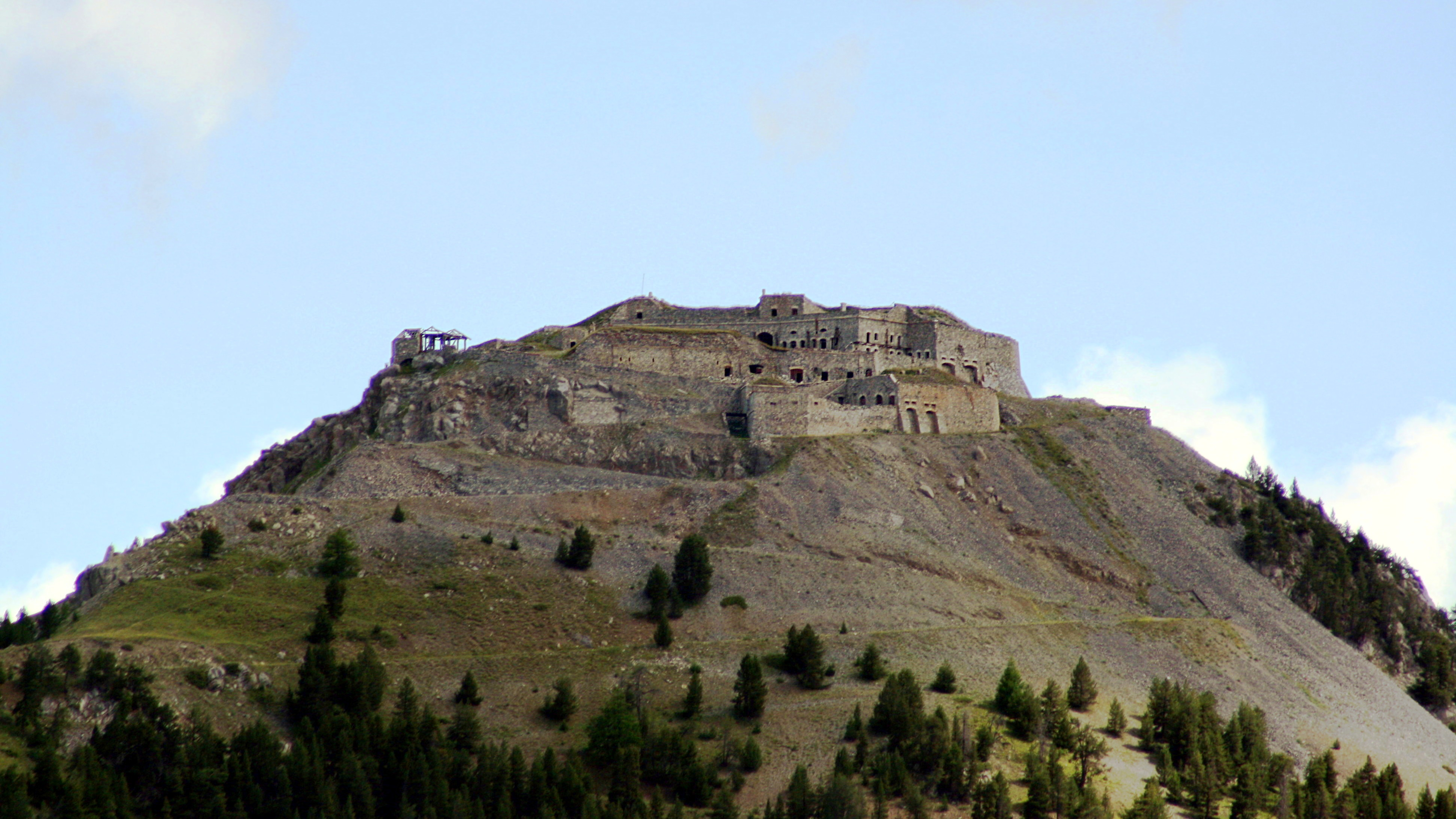

Site information
- Owner: French military
- Controlled by: France
- Open to the public: No
- Condition: Abandoned

Location
- Coordinates: 44.89423°N 6.68556°E

Site history
- Materials: Stone
- Battles/wars: Italian invasion of France

The Fort de l'Infernet is a fortification complex near Briançon in the French Alps. It was built as part of the Séré de Rivières system of fortifications in 1876–78 to defend France against invasion from Italy. It specifically overlooks the valley of the Durance behind and the Fort du Gondran, closer to Italy. Built at an elevation of 2,380 metres (7,810 ft), the fort was accessed by an aerial tramway, which connected to the older Fort du Randouillet at lower elevation. It was the last French fort to be built from cut stone masonry.

The construction of the fort required that its mountaintop be leveled, a process that produced landslides.

The 210-man garrison served an armament consisting of seven 138 mm guns, five 155 mm guns, two 220 mm mortars, two 150 mm mortars and six more 138 mm guns in a separate battery. Much of the armament was placed on a cavalier or gun platform on top of the masonry barracks. The garrison was accommodated in two barracks at somewhat lower elevation, La Cochette and La Seyte, with a portion of the total contingent rotated into the fort for duty. The aerial tramway was operated by mule power.

In 1940 the fort was manned as a backup fortification to the Alpine Line fortifications of the Maginot Line program, and was bombarded on 21 and 23 June 1940 by mortars at Fort Mont Chaberton. 280 mm field mortars placed at Infernet replied, silencing the Italian battery.
