= Col de Montgenèvre =

Mountain pass in France

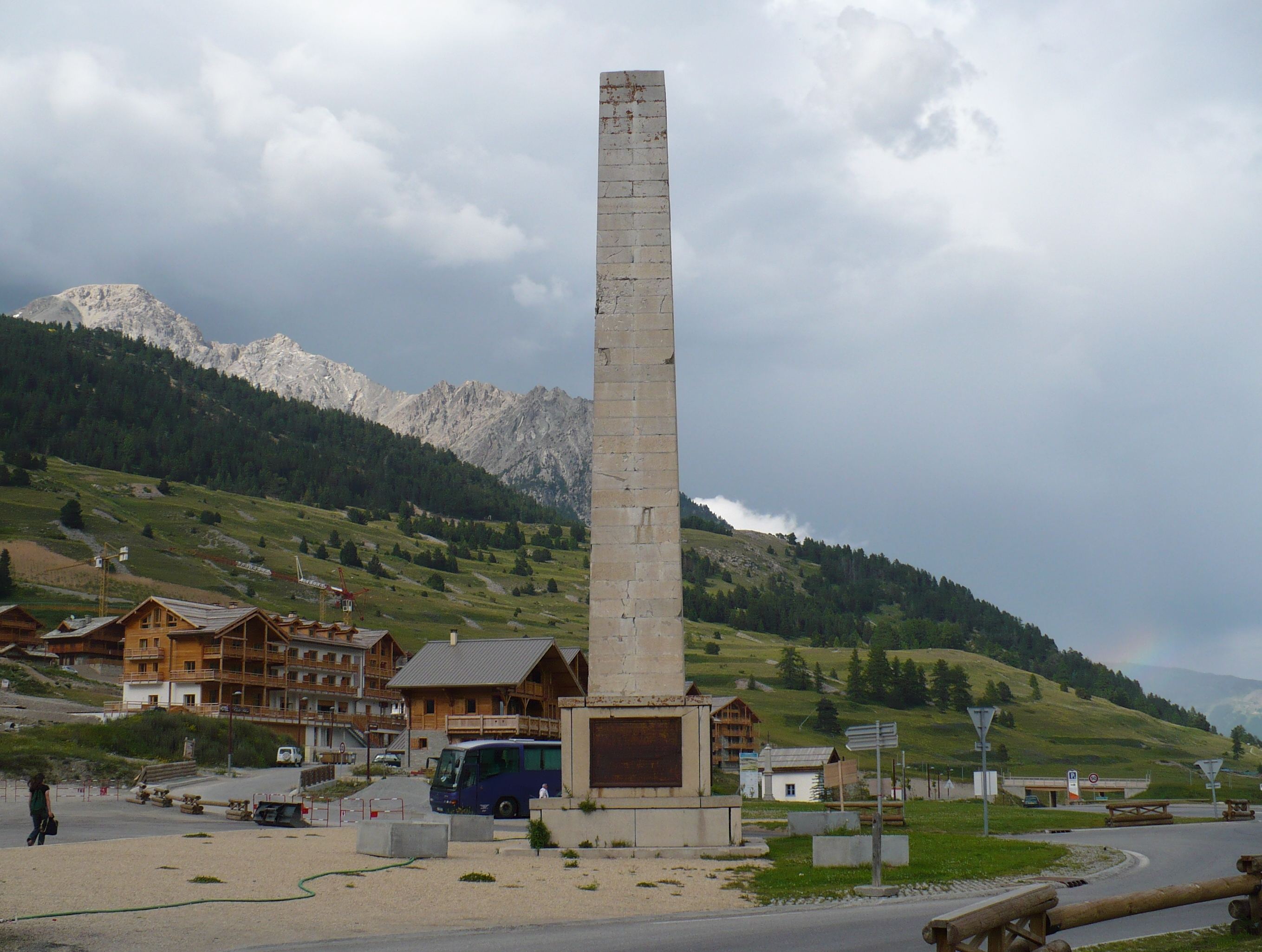
- The obelisk celebrating Napoleon Bonaparte was erected in September 1804, two months before the First Consul had himself promoted and crowned as emperor.

- Location within Alps
- Elevation: 1,860 m (6,100 ft)
- Traversed by: Route nationale 94 (France)

Third Approach
- Location: Hautes-Alpes, France
- Range: Cottian Alps
- Coordinates: 44°55′51″N 6°43′24″E

The Col de Montgenèvre (Italian: Passo del Monginevro; elevation 1860 m.) is a high mountain pass in the Cottian Alps, in France 2 kilometres away from Italy.

== Description ==
The pass takes its name from the village Montgenèvre (Hautes-Alpes), which lies in the vicinity. It links Briançon in the upper Durance valley with the Susa Valley and its communes of Cesana Torinese and Susa in the Metropolitan City of Turin, Piedmont.

The Col de Montgenèvre is an important road connection, and is kept open in winter. Its importance has always lain in the fact that it is the lowest of the principal crossings of the main range of the Alps between France and Italy.

== History ==
It was known to the Romans before 118 BC, when Gnaeus Domitius Ahenobarbus started construction of the Via Domitia road, which terminated at the pass. Roman General Pompey used it on his campaign to Spain in 77 BC and claimed to have opened up a more favorable route. It was later used by Julius Caesar in travelling to Gaul and then became the main route for travel between Roman Italy and southern Gaul or Spain.

The Col de Montgenèvre is considered a possible route for Hannibal's famous passage through the Alps on his journey from the Rhône river valley to Italy.

Through this pass, Charles VIII of France led his army in September 1494 on his way to capture the Kingdom of Naples, which would spark 65 years of intermittent warfare up and down the Italian Peninsula, later known as the Italian Wars.

The strategic importance of the pass, the lowest over this part of the Alps, caused several forts to be built, such as Briançon and Fort Janus.

== Tour de France ==
The Col de Montgenèvre has appeared on the Tour de France 10 times.:

=== Tour de France Stage Finish ===
Year	Stage	Start of stage	Distance (km)	Category	Stage winner	Leader in general classification
1976	10	Le Bourg-d'Oisans	166	1	Joop Zoetemelk (NED)	Lucien Van Impe (BEL)

=== Other Appearances in the Tour de France ===
Year	Stage	Category	Start	Finish	Leader at the Summit
1949	17	3	Briançon	Aosta	Gino Bartali (ITA)
1952	11	3	Le Bourg-d'Oisans	Sestrières	Fausto Coppi (ITA)
1956	17	2	Turin	Gap	Valentin Huot (FRA)
1966	17	2	Briançon	Turin	Julio Jiménez (ESP)
1992	14	2	Sestrières	Alpe d'Huez	Richard Virenque (FRA)
1996	9	2	Le Monêtier-les-Bains	Sestrières	Richard Virenque (FRA)
1996	10	1	Turin	Gap	Bjarne Riis (DEN)
1999	9	2	Le Grand-Bornand	Sestrières	Richard Virenque (FRA)
2011	17	2	Gap	Pinerolo	Sylvain Chavanel (FRA)
2024	4	2	Pinerolo	Valloire	Stephen Williams (GBR)

== Vuelta a España ==
The Col de Montgenèvre featured on Stage 4 of the 2025 Vuelta a España.

Year	Stage	Category	Start	Finish	Leader at the Summit
2025	4	2	Susa	Voiron	Louis Vervaeke (BEL)

== See also ==
- Cottii Regnum
- List of highest paved roads in Europe
- List of mountain passes
