= Fort of São João das Maias =

Fort near Lisbon, Portugal

- Forte de São João das Maias
- Oeiras, Lisbon District, Portugal
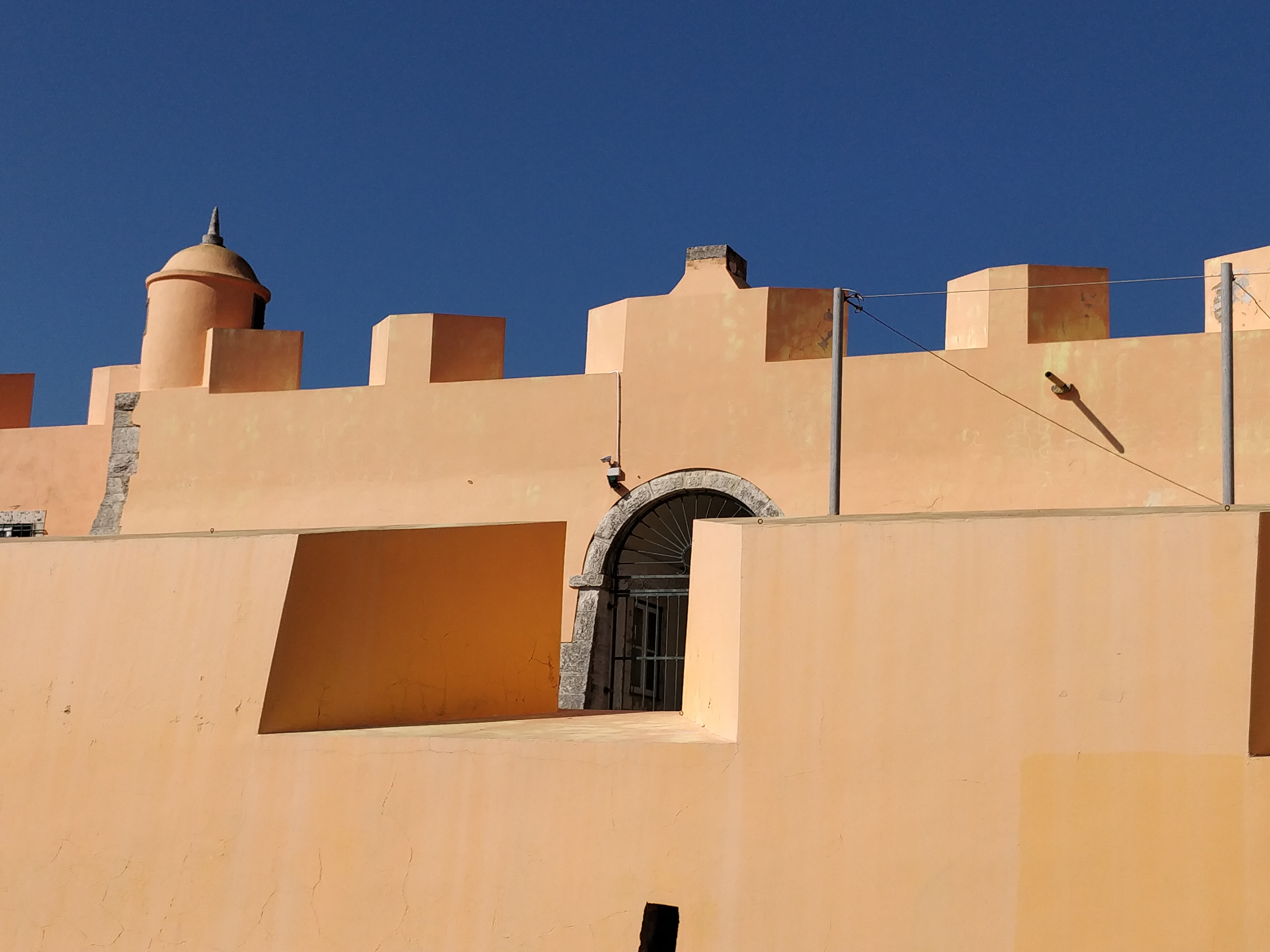

Site information
- Type: Bastion fort
- Owner: Public
- Open to the public: No
- Condition: Restored

Location
- Coordinates: 38°41′07″N 9°18′16″W

Site history
- Built: 1644-1653 with subsequent modifications
- Built by: António Luís de Meneses, 1st Marquis of Marialva
- In use: Retirement home

The Fort of São João das Maias, also known as the Fort of Oeiras, is located on the right bank of the River Tagus estuary, in the municipality of Oeiras in the Lisbon District of Portugal. It was constructed between 1644 and 1653. Until 2010 it had been allowed to fall into a state of advanced degradation but in that year it was restored.

== History ==
Under the supervision of António Luís de Meneses, 1st Marquis of Marialva, the fort was constructed during the reign of King John IV in a Mannerist style, following an irregular pentagon design. This was done in order to reinforce the defence of the capital in the context of the Restoration War between 1640 and 1668, that culminated in the Treaty of Lisbon (1668) with Spanish recognition of Portuguese sovereignty. It was built to support the Fort of São Julião da Barra to its southwest, crossing fire with the Fort of São Lourenço do Bugio, situated in the middle of the estuary, and the Fort of Santo Amaro do Areeiro, situated between it and São Julião da Barra. It thus formed part of a line of fortifications that stretched from Cabo da Roca on the Atlantic coast to the Belém Tower, close to Lisbon. Its strategic position dominated the channel through which shipping still passes today to avoid shallow bars close to the banks. In 1644 it was already garrisoned by twenty soldiers, ten gunners and a chief of artillery, with five cannons, but the works were only completed in 1653.

In 1735, the fort was reported as being in a good state of repair, but its artillery was reduced to 2 pieces of 24-gauge cannon and another 12 of various calibres that were out of service. Repair works were carried out in the middle of the same century, including the application of tiles in the small chapel. However, soon after work was completed the fort and chapel were severely damaged by the earthquake of November 1, 1755, although many of the tiles have survived. A decade later work was carried out to expand the structure, beginning with the so-called New Battery.

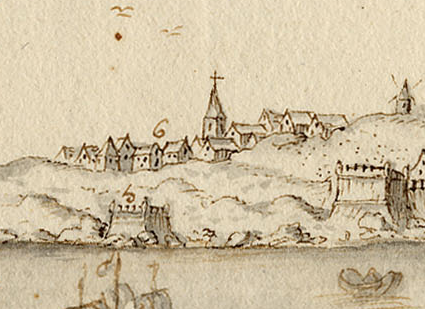
View of the fort from 1763

In 1802, after the brief War of the Oranges in 1801, there were 24 artillery pieces of various calibres: eight on the original battery, twelve on a new battery, and four on the terrace above the strong house. In the context of the Peninsular War (1808–1814) the Fort of São João das Maias was integrated into the third of three lines of defence known as the Lines of Torres Vedras, at the extremity of a wall and trench designated "Military Work No. 110" out of a total of 152 works in the three lines. While the first two lines to the north of Lisbon were designed to protect the Portuguese capital, this third line was aimed at protecting the possible evacuation of Portuguese and British soldiers, the latter commanded by Arthur Wellesley, 1st Duke of Wellington. The evacuation was planned to take place at the fort of São Julião da Barra but was not required due to the success of the most northerly of the lines in resisting French troops.

At the time of the Portuguese Civil War (1828–1834), the fort had 14 artillery pieces of various calibres. It was rebuilt in 1853 and further restoration was carried out in 1868 but the fort was never again used and, like other coastal fortifications at the time, it eventually fell into disrepair. In 1940 some of its land was given over for the construction of the new coastal road from Lisbon to Cascais, known as the Marginal. After this it had various uses as holiday camps for military families, including for the Portuguese Legion, a paramilitary organization of the right-wing Estado Novo dictatorship. After the return to democracy with the Carnation Revolution in 1974, the fort was returned to the armed forces, and continued to be used as a holiday camp until 1996.
