= Fort of Nossa Senhora das Mercês de Catalazete =

17th Century fortress in Portugal

- Forte de Nossa Senhora das Mercês de Catalazete
- Oeiras, Lisbon District, Portugal
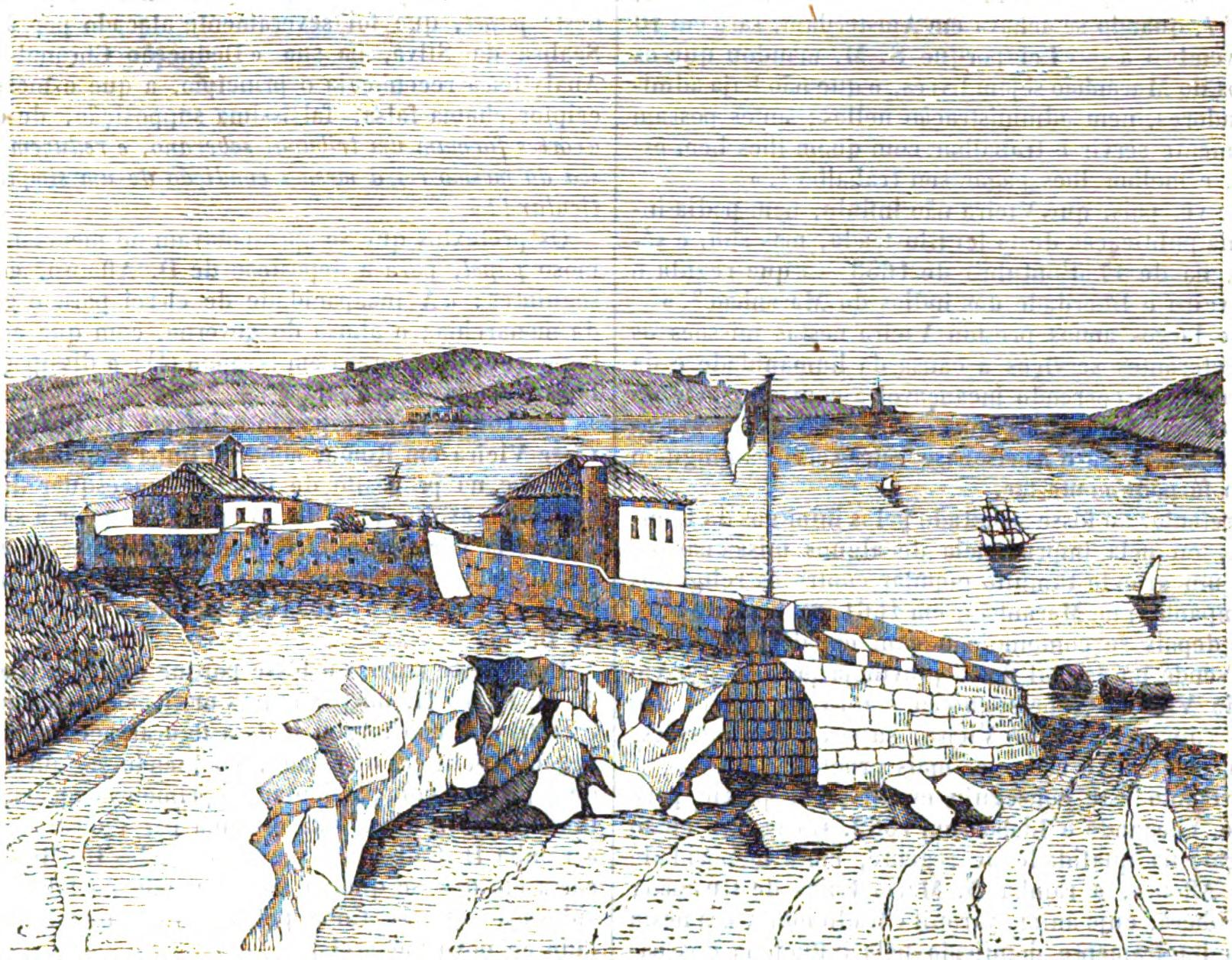
- Early print of the fort

Site information
- Type: Bastion fort
- Open to the public: No

Location
- Coordinates: 38°40′40″N 9°19′03″W

Site history
- Built: 1763 with subsequent modifications
- In use: Youth hostel
- Materials: Basalt
- Battles/wars: Battle of the Tagus

The Fort of Nossa Senhora das Mercês de Catalazete, also known as the Fort of Catalazete, is located on the right bank of the River Tagus estuary in the municipality of Oeiras in the Lisbon District of Portugal. The fort dates back to 1762, when a small battery was erected on a site between the Fort of São Julião da Barra and the Fort of Santo Amaro do Areeiro, with the purpose of strengthening the defence provided by those two forts.

== History ==
Built at the time of the Spanish–Portuguese War (1762-63) and the Seven Years' War (1756-63), which involved all European powers, the Fort of Catalazete had an irregular pentagonal design. It initially consisted solely of a masonry parapet, which had been completed by 1763 when an inspection visit reported a garrison with nine firearms, two of 40-gauge bronze and seven of 24-gauge iron. An inspection in 1777 reported that it was still open on the land side (northwest). At this time it was given to a farming family to guard and maintain, while still having artillery and bullets on site. Conservation work was carried out in 1793 and a report from 1796 indicated there were ten 24-gauge pieces. In 1804 it was garrisoned by two corporals and thirteen soldiers. Unlike other maritime strongholds at the time, it remained garrisoned and equipped after the Peninsular War ended in 1814. During the Portuguese Civil War (1828-34), the Fort of Catalazete was guarded by a sergeant, a corporal and twenty artillery soldiers. In 1831 its 36-Caliber pieces responded with 17 shots to the fire of the French fleet that, under the command of Admiral Roussin, entered the River Tagus in 1831, going on to anchor in the port of Lisbon, where it captured eight ships and imposed on Miguel I of Portugal a humiliating surrender. This appears to have been the only time the fort was involved in combat.

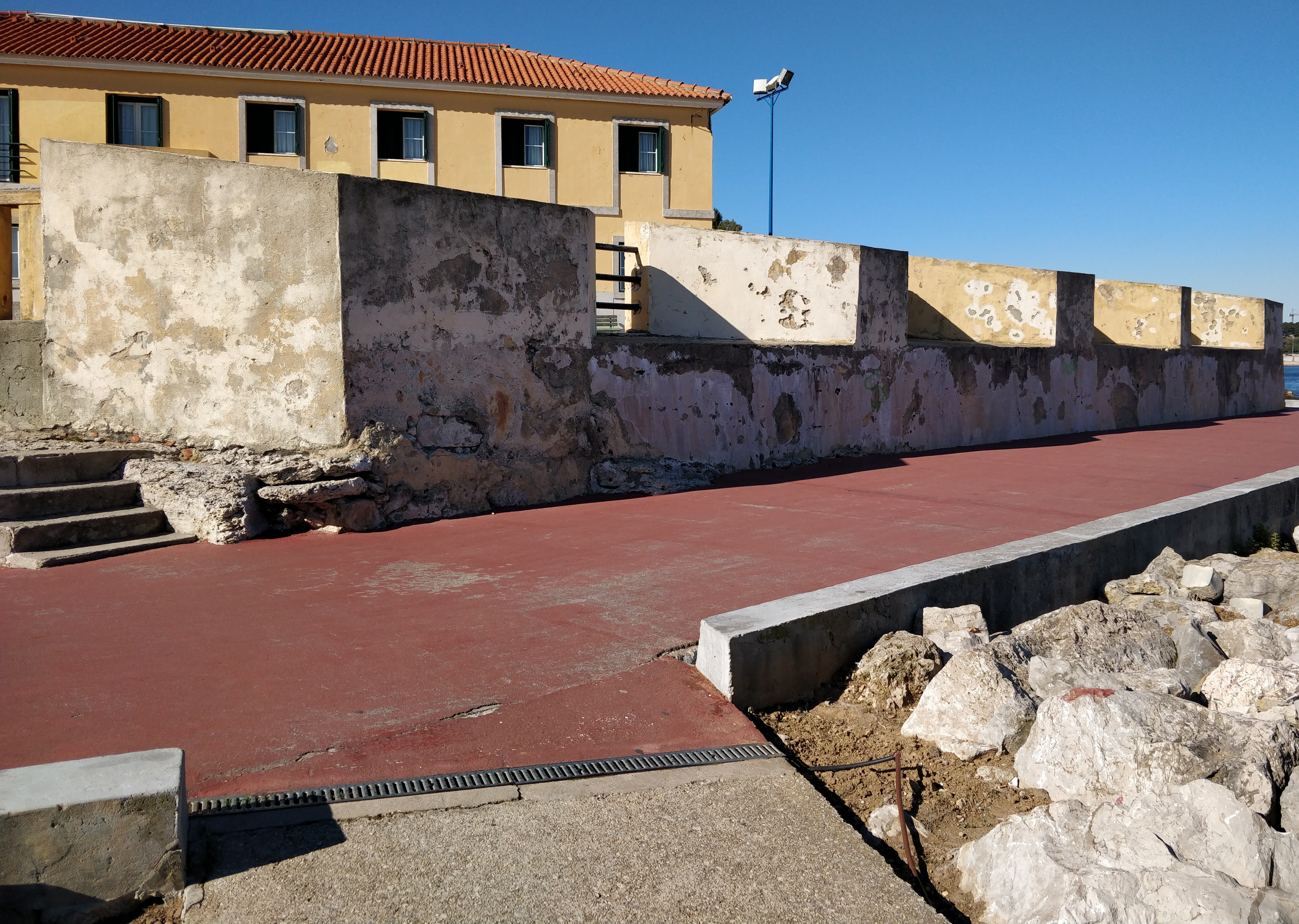
The fort today

The fort was deactivated in the middle of the 19th century, when it was inhabited by a single veteran soldier. In 1888 the premises were leased for nine years to a private individual who converted the fort into his residence. He was evicted in 1897 for having failed to pay the rent and a new tenant identified. During the Estado Novo dictatorship (1926-68) the Fort of Catalazete was used by the families of military officials. It was considerably damaged by waves during a strong cyclone-like windstorm that had a direct hit on Lisbon on February 15-16, 1941. Repairs were carried out in 1942 as part of the landscaping for the new Lisbon to Cascais road, known as the Marginal. Following considerable dispute about its use in the 1950s, it became a holiday camp in 1959 for the Mocidade Portuguesa, a government-established youth group, which converted it to use as a youth hostel in 1962. Since 1977, it has been occupied by the Portuguese Association of Youth Hostels.
