= List of shipwrecks in December 1856 =

The list of shipwrecks in December 1856 includes ships sunk, foundered, grounded, or otherwise lost during December 1856.

== 1 December ==
List of shipwrecks: 1 December 1856
Ship	State	Description
Black Sea	Russia	The steamship was driven ashore and wrecked on Naissaar.
Caroline	United Kingdom	The ship was driven ashore at Helsingør, Denmark.
Christina Leer	Netherlands	The ship was wrecked on the Meewestaart. Her crew were rescued.
Crisis	United Kingdom	The ship was driven ashore in the Yangtze. She was on a voyage from Shanghai, China to Liverpool, Lancashire. She was refloated and resumed her voyage.
Cutter	United Kingdom	The ship ran aground in The Wash. She was refloated the next day.
Enterprise	United Kingdom	The ship ran aground on the Diamond Reef. She was on a voyage from New York, United States to Liverpool. She was refloated and put back to New York in a leaky condition.
Hamilton	United Kingdom	The ship sprang a leak on the Dogger Bank. She was set afire and abandoned. Her crew were rescued by Niord (Flag unknown). Hamilton was on a voyage from Kronstadt, Russia to London.
Napoleon III	France	The steamship ran aground at Stettin.
Putton	United Kingdom	The brig ran aground on the Seal Sand, in The Wash. She was refloated.
Ranger	United Kingdom	The fishing smack was in collision with the sloop Hesperus (Denmark) and sank in the North Sea 40 nautical miles (74 km) off Whitby, Yorkshire with the loss of a crew member. Hesperus also lost a crew member.
Troy	United Kingdom	The ship ran aground on the Diamond Reef and sank off Bedloes Island. She was on a voyage from New York to Cardiff, Glamorgan.

== 2 December ==
List of shipwrecks: 2 December 1856
Ship	State	Description
Canadian	(United Kingdom of Great Britain and Ireland) British North America	The schooner was driven ashore east of Oakville, Province of Canada.
Dundas	United Kingdom	The steamship was wrecked at Burlington Bay, Province of Canada.
Eliza Ryan	United Kingdom	The schooner was driven ashore and capsized at Placentia, Newfoundland, British North America. She was on a voyage from Halifax, Nova Scotia, British North America to Liverpool, Lancashire. She was consequently condemned.
Henrietta	Prussia	The brig struck a sunken object and sank in the River Tees as Billingham, County Durham, United Kingdom. She was on a voyage from Stockton-on-Tees, County Durham to Memel.
Johann Frederick	Prussia	The ship departed from Pillau for Hull, Yorkshire, United Kingdom. No further trace, presumed foundered with the loss of all hands.
Leviathan	United States	The ship caught fire whilst on a voyage from New York to Porto, Portugal. She consequently put in to Bermuda in a severely damaged condition.
Live Yankee	(United Kingdom of Great Britain and Ireland) British North America	The schooner was driven ashore at Port Credit, Province of Canada. Her crew survived.
Lord Elgin	(United Kingdom of Great Britain and Ireland) British North America	The steamship was driven ashore and wrecked at Long Point, Lake Ontario.
Mary	United Kingdom	The brig sprang a leak and foundered in the Mediterranean Sea (37°28′N 4°55′E). Her nine crew were rescued by the barque Sir Alexander (United Kingdom). Mary was on a voyage from Cardiff, Glamorgan to Alexandria, Egypt.
Roberts	United Kingdom	The ship was discovered abandoned in the Baltic Sea by the steamship Secret (United Kingdom). She was towed in to Rostock.
Roschid	Stettin	The steamship ran aground. She was on a voyage from Stettin to Leith, Lothian, United Kingdom. She was refloated.

== 3 December ==
List of shipwrecks: 3 December 1856
Ship	State	Description
Baron de Bruck	United Kingdom	The ship was driven ashore and wrecked at Portoscuso, Sardinia with the loss of all hands. She was on a voyage from Troon, Ayrshire to Trieste.
Belfast	United Kingdom	The steamship ran aground in the Clyde downstream of Greenock, Renfrewshire. She was refloated the next day.
Danube	United Kingdom	The ship was driven onto the Stark Rock, off the coast of Pembrokeshire. She was on a voyage from Wallace, Nova Scotia, British North America to Liverpool, Lancashire. She was refloated with assistance from HMS Lucifer (Royal Navy) and towed in to Hubberstone Pill.
Firefly	United Kingdom	The steamship ran aground on Whitburn Steel. She was on a voyage from London to Sunderland, County Durham. She was refloated and made for North Shields, County Durham but sank. She was refloated on 4 December and beached at South Shields.
Jenny	Sweden	The ship was lost near Ringkøbing, Denmark with the loss of two of her crew. She was on a voyage from Ystad to Leith, Lothian, United Kingdom.
John Glaister	United Kingdom	The schooner was driven ashore, capsized and was wrecked at Derbyhaven, Isle of Man. She was on a voyage from Fleetwood, Lancashire to Drogheda, County Louth.
Linnet	(United Kingdom of Great Britain and Ireland) British North America	The ship was wrecked in the Digby Gat with the loss of at least three of her crew. She was on a voyage from Saint John, New Brunswick to Granville, Nova Scotia.
Monarch	(United Kingdom of Great Britain and Ireland) British North America	The steamship was wrecked at Oswego. Her crew were rescued. She was on a voyage from Montreal to Toronto, Province of Canada.
Niagara	United States	The schooner was wrecked at Port Hope, Province of Canada. Her crew were rescued, but two rescuers were drowned.
Pomona	United States	The schooner was driven ashore near Sandy Cove, British North America. Her crew were rescued. She was on a voyage from Granville, Nova Scotia to Boston, Massachusetts.
Sarah	United Kingdom	The ship ran aground on the Maplin Sand, in the North Sea off the coast of Essex. She was on a voyage from Margate, Kent to Sunderland, County Durham.
Sisters	United Kingdom	The Mersey Flat was run down and sunk in the River Mersey off Birkenhead, Cheshire by the Mersey Ferry Lord Morpeth (United Kingdom). Both crew were rescued by Lord Morpeth.
Washington	United States	The schooner was wrecked near Annapolis, Maryland with the loss of three of her crew. She was on a voyage from Clementsport, Nova Scotia to Boston, Massachusetts.
Zalt Bommel	Netherlands	The ship was driven ashore and wrecked at Cape Town, Cape Colony.

== 4 December ==
List of shipwrecks: 4 December 1856
Ship	State	Description
Earl of Leicester	United Kingdom	The ship was driven ashore and damaged at Flamborough Head, Yorkshire. She was on a voyage from London to Hartlepool, County Durham. She was refloated and taken in to Bridlington, Yorkshire.
Helen Hardy	United Kingdom	The ship was in collision with another vessel and sank in the North Sea off Hartlepool, County Durham. Her crew were rescued.
Henry Hood	United Kingdom	The ship was wrecked at "Karrbolmen", Sweden. Her crew were rescued. She was on a voyage from Whitby, Yorkshire to Gothenburg, Sweden.
Ivy	United Kingdom	The local vessel was wrecked 4 miles south of Scarborough, Yorkshire, outward from Scarborough.
Myra	United Kingdom	The ship caught fire in the Mediterranean Sea. She was on a voyage from Newcastle upon Tyne, Northumberland to Alexandria, Egypt. She was abandoned on 6 December.
Nancy	United Kingdom	The brig ran aground on the Filey Brigg. She was on a voyage from Sunderland, County Durham, to Nieuwediep, South Holland, Netherlands.
Petrel	United Kingdom	The brig foundered in the Sea of Azov off "Fursoff", Russia.
Rose	United Kingdom	The ship struck a rock off Lindisfarne, Northumberland and sank. she was on a voyage from Sunderland to Port Gordon, Moray.
Vesper	United Kingdom	The brig ran aground on the Insand, in the North Sea off the coast of County Durham.

== 5 December ==
List of shipwrecks: 5 December 1856
Ship	State	Description
Ann	United Kingdom	The brig was driven ashore on the Hartley Rocks, Northumberland. She was on a voyage from London to Newcastle upon Tyne, Northumberland. She was refloated the next day and towed in to the River Tyne.
Augustine	France	The schooner ran aground and sank at Redcar, Yorkshire, United Kingdom. Her crew were rescued.
Betsey	United Kingdom	The ship was driven ashore at Redcar.
Comely	United Kingdom	The schooner was driven ashore at Newbiggin, Northumberland. She was refloated on 11 December and taken in to Blyth, Northumberland.
Elizabeth and Mary	United Kingdom	The ship was driven ashore at Hawthornhive, County Durham. She was on a voyage from Great Yarmouth, Norfolk to Newcastle upon Tyne. She was refloated with assistance from a steamship and towed in to the River Tyne in a severely leaky condition.
Enterprise	United Kingdom	The sloop ran aground on the Blackshaw Banks, in the Irish Sea. She was on a voyage from Liverpool, Lancashire to Dumfries.
Fear-Not	United Kingdom	The schooner was driven ashore and wrecked at Redcar.
Hoffnung	Kingdom of Hanover	The ship was driven ashore at Redcar. She was refloated and taken in to Middlesbrough, Yorkshire.
Homely	United Kingdom	The ship was driven ashore at Newbiggin, Northumberland. She was on a voyage from Rotterdam, South Holland, Netherlands to Grangemouth, Stirlingshire.
J. & A. Going	United Kingdom	The schooner was driven ashore and wrecked at Flamborough Head, Yorkshire. She was on a voyage from Maldon, Essex to South Shields, County Durham.
Jane and Elizabeth	United Kingdom	The ship was wrecked in Cala Domestica, Sardinia. Her crew were rescued. She was on a voyage from Newcastle upon Tyne, Northumberland to Toulon, Var, France.
Jean and Jessie	United Kingdom	The schooner sank off in the North Sea off False Immanuel Head, Northumberland. Her crew were rescued.
John and Eliza	United Kingdom	The ship was driven ashore at Redcar.
Nancy	United Kingdom	The sloop ran aground and sank at Redcar. Her crew were rescued.
Ross	United Kingdom	The sloop ran aground off Immanuel Head, Northumberland. She was refloated but consequently foundered. Her crew survived. She was on a voyage from Sunderland, County Durham, to Port Gordon, Moray.
Sarah and Mary	United Kingdom	The schooner ran aground in the River Mersey at Rock Ferry, Cheshire. She was on a voyage from Charlestown, Cornwall to Runcorn, Cheshire. She was refloated the next day.

== 6 December ==
List of shipwrecks: 6 December 1856
Ship	State	Description
Anne Blair	United Kingdom	The ship was driven ashore and wrecked at Aberystwyth, Cardiganshire. She was on a voyage from Quebec City, Province of Canada, British North America to Aberystwyth.
Augusta Jessie	United Kingdom	The ship sank in Lough Swilly. She was later refloated and towed in to Londonderry for repairs. She arrived on 17 December.
Carl	Rostock	The ship was driven ashore at Formby, Lancashire, United Kingdom. Her crew were rescued. She was on a voyage from Kilrush, County Clare, United Kingdom to Liverpool, Lancashire.
Clarendon	United States	The full-rigged ship was driven ashore and wrecked at Redness Point, north of Whitehaven, Cumberland, United Kingdom. Twelve of her 21 crew were rescued by the Whitehaven Lifeboat, the rest subsequently got ashore. She was on her maiden voyage, from Miramichi, New Brunswick, British North America to Westport, County Mayo, United Kingdom and then Liverpool.
Cruiser	United Kingdom	The brig was driven ashore near Southsea Castle, Hampshire.
Echo Mary, or Mary	United Kingdom	The schooner ran aground on Taylor's Bank, in Liverpool Bay and sank. Her crew survived. She was on a voyage from Poole, Dorset to Runcorn, Cheshire.
Louisa Munro	United Kingdom	The barque was driven ashore and wrecked at Marloes, Pembrokeshire with the loss of nine of her thirteen crew. She was on a voyage from Malta to Cardiff, Glamorgan.
Mayflower	United Kingdom	The ship was driven ashore on Loch Castle Island, Inner Hebrides. She was on a voyage from Barrow-in-Furness, Lancashire to Arisaig, Inverness-shire. She was refloated on 14 December and beached at Tobermory, Isle of Mull, Inner Hebrides.
Messenger	United Kingdom	The brig was run down and sunk in the North Sea off Seaham, County Durham by the steamship James Hartley (United Kingdom) with the loss of six of her eight crew. Survivors were rescued by James Hartley. Messenger was on a voyage from London to South Shields.
Napoleon	(United Kingdom of Great Britain and Ireland) British North America	The steamship was wrecked in Burlington Bay.
Richardson	United Kingdom	The barque was driven ashore at Swansea, Glamorgan. She was on a voyage from Coquimbo, Chile to Swansea. She was refloated on 10 December and towed in to Swansea.
Sarah	United Kingdom	The ship ran aground on the Wadero Storo, off the coast of Sweden and sank. Her crew were rescued.

== 7 December ==
List of shipwrecks: 7 December 1856
Ship	State	Description
Amintuse	United Kingdom	The sloop sank off Lindisfarne, Northumberland.
Amphitrite	Norway	The ship was lost off "Porten".
Anne	United Kingdom	The ship was driven ashore and wrecked at Aberystwyth, Cardiganshire.
Betsey	United Kingdom	The schooner was driven ashore at Redcar, Yorkshire. She was on a voyage from Great Yarmouth, Norfolk to South Shields, County Durham. She was refloated and resumed her voyage.
Ceres	United Kingdom	The ship was driven ashore and wrecked at "Pilkieppen". Her crew were rescued. She was on a voyage from Pillau, Prussia to Hull, Yorkshire.
Clemence	France	The brigantine was wrecked in Carnarvon Bay. Her six crew were rescued. She was on a voyage from a French port to Newport, Monmouthshire, United Kingdom.
Columbus	United Kingdom	The barque was driven ashore near St Mawes Castle, Cornwall. She was on a voyage from London to Shanghai, China.
Cornely	United Kingdom	The ship was driven ashore at Newbiggin, Northumberland.
Dahlia	France	The schooner ran aground on the Newcombe Sand, in the North Sea off the coast of Suffolk, United Kingdom. She was refloated and beached at Lowestoft, Suffolk.
Fordmill	United Kingdom	The ship was driven ashore in Rosilly Bay. She was on a voyage from Cardiff, Glamorgan to Málaga, Spain.
George	United Kingdom	The ship ran aground on the Aldeburgh Neaps, in the North Sea off the coast of Suffolk. She was refloated and assisted in to Great Yarmouth in a leaky condition.
I. and A. Goring	United Kingdom	The schooner was driven ashore at Flamborough Head, Yorkshire.
J. L. Warner	United States	The full-rigged ship was driven ashore and wrecked at Carnsore Point, County Wexford, United Kingdom. Her crew were rescued by the Coastguard. She was refloated on 28 January 1857.
Leeuw	Netherlands	The ship was driven ashore and wrecked at Nairn, United Kingdom. She was on a voyage from Memel, Prussia to Liverpool, Lancashire, United Kingdom.
Margaret	United Kingdom	The schooner was driven ashore and wrecked in Ardmore Bay. Her crew were rescued.
Marie Mathilde	France	The schooner was driven ashore and wrecked at Atherfield, Isle of Wight.
Mars	France	The schooner was driven ashore and wrecked at Atherfield with the loss of two of her crew.
Nuevo Torcuvato	Spain	The brig foundered. Her crew were rescued by the Tenby Lifeboat.
Princess	United Kingdom	The ship was driven ashore at Warrenpoint, County Down.
Richardsons	United Kingdom	The barque was driven ashore at Swansea, Glamorgan. She was on a voyage from Coquimbo, Chile to Swansea.
Rose	United Kingdom	The ship sank off Lindisfarne.
Sovereign	United Kingdom	The schooner was driven ashore and severely damaged at Fraserburgh, Aberdeenshire. She was refloated and towed in to Fraserburgh.

== 8 December ==
List of shipwrecks: 8 December 1856
Ship	State	Description
Adriatic	United Kingdom	The barque was driven ashore and wrecked near Dungarvan, County Waterford with the loss of ten lives. She was on a voyage from Liverpool, Lancashire to New York, United States. The wreck was refloated on 8 February 1857 and towed in to Queenstown, County Cork.
Betsey Harlock	United Kingdom	The schooner was driven ashore at Redcar, Yorkshire. She was refloated and taken in Middlesbrough, Yorkshire.
Columbus	United Kingdom	The ship was driven ashore near St. Mawes Castle, Cornwall. She was on a voyage from Odesa to Falmouth, Cornwall.
Condor	Hamburg	The schooner collided with Beecher Stowe (United Kingdom) and sank off the Isles of Scilly, United Kingdom with the loss of all but two of her crew.
Derwent	United Kingdom	The brig was driven ashore and wrecked at Beckfoot, Cumberland. She was abandoned by her crew.
Don	United Kingdom	The ship was driven ashore at Saundersfoot, Pembrokeshire.
Favourite	United Kingdom	The ship was driven ashore and wrecked in Dingle Bay. She was on a voyage from Tralee, County Kerry to London.
Hamelia	France	The ship was driven ashore at Argelès-sur-Mer, Pyrénées-Orientales. She was on a voyage from Marseille, Bouches-du-Rhône to "Palmos".
Importer	United Kingdom	The ship was abandoned in the Irish Sea off Poor Head, County Cork. Her crew were rescued by the schooner Alma (Sweden). She was subsequently driven ashore at Ballycotton, County Cork. She was on a voyage from Newport, Monmouthshire to Jamaica. She subsequently broke up.
Lady Huntington	United Kingdom	The schooner was driven ashore and wrecked on the coast of Cumberland.
Louisiana	United Kingdom	The ship ran aground on the Black Rock, off the coast of Ayrshire. Her crew were rescued. She was on a voyage from Liverpool to Genoa, Kingdom of Sardinia. She was consequently condemned.
Mara	France	The schooner was driven ashore and wrecked at Atherstone, Isle of Wight, United Kingdom with the loss of two of her crew.
Seabird	United Kingdom	The ship was driven ashore at Dungarvan, County Waterford. She was on a voyage from Halifax, Nova Scotia, British North America to Liverpool. She had been refloated by 13 December.
Silistria	United Kingdom	The ship ran aground on the Maplin Sand, in the North Sea off the coast of Essex. She was on a voyage from Cádiz, Spain to London.
Swift	United Kingdom	The brig was driven ashore and wrecked on the coast of Cumberland.
Teneriffe	United Kingdom	The schooner was driven ashore at St. Bees Head, Cumberland. Her crew were rescued. She was on a voyage from Patras, Greece to Liverpool. Teneriffe was refloated on 29 January and beached at Whitehaven, Cumberland.
Thornley	United Kingdom	The sloop was wrecked on the Arrat Bank, in the North Sea off the coast of Forfarshire. Her crew were rescued.
T. J. Crisp	United Kingdom	The ship foundered in the Mediterranean Sea. Her crew were rescued.
Vixen	United Kingdom	The ship was driven ashore in Bowling Bay. She was on a voyage from Marseille, Bouches-du-Rhône, France to Liverpool.

== 9 December ==
List of shipwrecks: 9 December 1856
Ship	State	Description
Blonde	United Kingdom	The ship was driven ashore and wrecked in Fethard Bay, County Wexford.
Commandeur Hortfeldt	Norway	The ship sank off Coll, Inner Hebrides, United Kingdom. Her crew were rescued. She was on a voyage from Liverpool, Lancashire, United Kingdom to Bergen.
Edwin	United Kingdom	The ship was driven ashore in Lough Swilly. She was refloated on 17 December.
Eglinton	United Kingdom	The steamship was wrecked at Stralsund. Her crew were rescued. She was on a voyage from Leith, Lothian to Stralsund.
Elizabeth	Norway	The brigantine was driven ashore at Queenstown, County Cork, United Kingdom. She was on a voyage from Galaţi, Ottoman Empire to Queenstown.
Ellon	United Kingdom	The schooner was wrecked in Ballycotton Bay. Her crew were rescued.
Heinrich	Sweden	The brig was driven ashore near Porto Torres, Sardinia. She had sunk by 24 December.
Ismerie	France	The fishing smack sank off Rye, Sussex, United Kingdom. Her crew were rescued.
Mary Ann	United Kingdom	The ship was driven ashore and wrecked at Redcar.
Minerva	Grand Duchy of Oldenburg	The ship was driven ashore and wrecked at "Stockpool", Pembrokeshire, United Kingdom. Her crew were rescued. She was on a voyage from Newport, Monmouthshire, United Kingdom to Bahia, Brazil.
Minerva	(United Kingdom of Great Britain and Ireland) Guernsey	The ship was driven ashore and wrecked at Galley Head, County Cork. She was on a voyage from London to Demerara, British Guiana.
Myrtle	United Kingdom	The ship sank in Leinar Bay, Forfarshire.
Petronella	Netherlands	The barque was wrecked at Chesil Beach, Dorset, United Kingdom, with the loss of five of her crew. She was on a voyage from Akyab, Burma to Ghent, East Flanders, Belgium.
Progress	United Kingdom	The steamship ran aground off Duncannon, County Waterford. She was on a voyage from Lisbon, Portugal to Waterford. She was refloated.
HMRC Tar	Board of Customs	The cutter was driven ashore and severely damaged at Copper Point, County Cork.

== 10 December ==
List of shipwrecks: 10 December 1856
Ship	State	Description
Catherine	United Kingdom	The ship was driven ashore in the River Liffey. She was on a voyage from Liverpool, Lancashire to Gibraltar.
C. S. Fletcher	United Kingdom	The ship struck a rock off the Skellig Islands, County Kerry and sank. She was on a voyage from Cardiff, Glamorgan to New Orleans, Louisiana, United States.
Earl Talbot	United Kingdom	The brig was driven ashore at South Shields, County Durham. Her crew were rescued.
Edward	United Kingdom	The barque was driven ashore at Seven Heads, County Cork. Her crew were rescued. She was on a voyage from Quebec City, Province of Canada, British North America to London.
Elizabeth	Norway	The schooner was driven ashore at Queenstown, County Cork, United Kingdom.
Emerald	United Kingdom	The brig was driven ashore and wrecked between Trabolgan and Poor Head, County Cork. Her crew were rescued. She was on a voyage from Alexandria, Egypt to Queenstown.
Enigma	United Kingdom	The ship was driven ashore at Shallags Brows, Isle of Man. She was on a voyage from London to Liverpool.
François Arin	France	The brig was driven ashore 2 nautical miles (3.7 km) east of Ballycotton, County Cork. She was on a voyage from Le Havre, Seine-Maritime to Lisbon, Portugal.
Great Britain	United Kingdom	The ship was driven ashore at South Shields. She was refloated and taken in to South Shields.
Jane	United Kingdom	The schooner was driven ashore and wrecked at Ballycotton, County Cork. She was on a voyage from Cardigan to Cork.
Pemberton	United Kingdom	The ship was driven ashore in the Chandeleur Islands, Louisiana, United States with the loss of three of her crew. She was on a voyage from London to New Orleans, Louisiana, United States.
Progress	United Kingdom	The steamship ran aground at Waterford. She was on a voyage from Lisbon, Portugal to Waterford.

== 11 December ==
List of shipwrecks: 11 December 1856
Ship	State	Description
Dione	Stettin	The barque sank off Greenore Point, County Louth, United Kingdom. Her crew were rescued. She was on a voyage from Cardiff, Glamorgan, United Kingdom to Bordeaux, Gironde, France.
Fredricke	Prussia	The schooner was wrecked on the Whitton Sand, in the North Sea. She was on a voyage from Königsberg to Gainsborough, Lincolnshire, United Kingdom.
James Stewart	United Kingdom	The ship was driven ashore at Hela, Prussia. She was on a voyage from Danzig to Perth. She was refloated and put back to Danzig.
Jane Ellis	United Kingdom	The ship was lost off the Île de Trielen, Finistère, France. Her crew survived. She was on a voyage from Taranto, Kingdom of the Two Sicilies to Hull, Yorkshire.
Myrtle	United Kingdom	The brig sank in Lunan Bay. Her crew were rescued. She was on a voyage from South Shields, County Durham to Kirkcaldy, Fife.
Neopolitan	Kingdom of the Two Sicilies	The schooner ran aground on the Scroby Sands, Norfolk, United Kingdom. She was on a voyage from Newcastle upon Tyne, Northumberland, United Kingdom to Naples. She was refloated and taken in to Great Yarmouth, Norfolk.
Salurian	United Kingdom	The ship was driven ashore on "Leeing Island". She was on a voyage from British Honduras to Glasgow, Renfrewshire.
Sultan	United Kingdom	The ship ran aground on the Great Burbo Bank, in Liverpool Bay. She was on a voyage from St. Ubes, Portugal to Liverpool, Lancashire. She was refloated and taken in to Liverpool in a leaky condition.
Thetis	United Kingdom	The ship was driven ashore on Læsø, Denmark. She was on a voyage from Horsens, Denmark to an English port. She was refloated and taken in to Fredrikshavn, Denmark in a leaky condition.

== 12 December ==
List of shipwrecks: 12 December 1856
Ship	State	Description
Grace	United Kingdom	The ship was abandoned in the Atlantic Ocean. Her crew were rescued by the schooner Gazelle (Denmark). Grace was on a voyage from Cuba to Liverpool, Lancashire.

== 13 December ==
List of shipwrecks: 13 December 1856
Ship	State	Description
Æriel	United Kingdom	The ship ran aground and was severely damaged. She was on a voyage from Sunderland, County Durham to Bordeaux, Gironde, France. She was later refloated and put back to Sunderland.
Arabian	United Kingdom	The ship ran aground on Taylor's Bank, in Liverpool Bay. She was on a voyage from New York, United States to Liverpool, Lancashire. She was refloated and towed in to Liverpool.
Celeste	United Kingdom	The ship was wrecked near Pondicherry, Indian.
Competitor	United Kingdom	The barque was wrecked at Mahón, Spain, with the loss of seven of her thirteen crew. She was on a voyage from Marseille, Bouches-du-Rhône, France to Havana, Cuba.
Charles Dumerque	France	The ship was wrecked near Pondicherry.
George Eliza	United Kingdom	The ship ran aground and was wrecked at the mouth of the Rio Grande. She was on a voyage from Lisbon, Portugal to the Rio Grande.
Harry Fleming	(United Kingdom of Great Britain and Ireland) South Australia	The ship was driven ashore at Port Elliot.
Lord Nelson	United Kingdom	The ship foundered in the Bay of Biscay. Her crew were rescued by Angela Burdett Coutts (United Kingdom). Lord Nelson was on a voyage from South Shields, County Durham to Constantinople, Ottoman Empire.
Sabine	United Kingdom	The barque was driven ashore at "Motul", Spain.
Sprightly	United Kingdom	The ship sprang a leak and was beached at Grimsby, Lincolnshire. She was on a voyage from Hartlepool, County Durham to Calais, France. The leak was fixed and she resumed her voyage.

== 14 December ==
List of shipwrecks: 14 December 1856
Ship	State	Description
Linda	United Kingdom	The ship was damaged by fire at Liverpool, Lancashire.

== 15 December ==
List of shipwrecks: 15 December 1856
Ship	State	Description
Ariel	United Kingdom	The barque ran aground at Sunderland, County Durham, and was damaged. She was refloated and put back to Sunderland.
Brightman	United Kingdom	The ship was abandoned in the Atlantic Ocean with the loss of a crew member. Survivors were rescued by Alice Thorndike (United Kingdom). Brightman was on a voyage from St. Stephen, New Brunswick to London.
Ceres	United Kingdom	The schooner ran aground on the Swinebottoms, in the Baltic Sea. She was on a voyage from Danzig to Dundee, Forfarshire. She was refloated and taken in to Helsingør, Denmark.
Eliza	(United Kingdom of Great Britain and Ireland) Guernsey	The collier, a barque, was driven ashore and wrecked in Donameney Bay, Finistère, France with the loss of five of the eight people on board. She was on a voyage from Newcastle upon Tyne, Northumberland to L'Orient, Morbihan, France.
Ida Charlotte	Sweden	The schooner ran aground near Hirtshals, Denmark and was wrecked. Her crew were rescued. She was on a voyage from Sunderland to Gothenburg.
Ritson	United Kingdom	The brig foundered in the Atlantic Ocean (45°44′N 10°44′W) with the loss of one of her seven crew. Survivors were rescued by the galiot Lucretia (Netherlands). Ritson was on a voyage from Liverpool, Lancashire to Barbados.
Sprightly	United Kingdom	The ship sprang a leak and was beached at Wainfleet, Lincolnshire, where she was wrecked. She was on a voyage from Grimsby, Lincolnshire to Calais.
Star	(United Kingdom of Great Britain and Ireland) British North America	The ship was blown out to sea from Flores Island, Azores and was abandoned by her crew. She was on a voyage from Barbados to Saint John's, Newfoundland. She drove ashore on 17 December and was wrecked.

== 16 December ==
List of shipwrecks: 16 December 1856
Ship	State	Description
Dolphin	Prussia	The ship was driven ashore near Swinemünde. She was on a voyage from South Shields, County Durham, United Kingdom to Swinemünde. She was refloated and completed her voyage.
Edward Kinney	United Kingdom	The barque was wrecked at the mouth of the Ebro. Her crew were rescued.
Johanna Kirwan	United Kingdom	The ship struck a rock and was beached at Fethard, County Wexford. She was on a voyage from Cardiff, Glamorgan to Waterford. She was later refloated and resumed her voyage, arriving at Waterford on 28 December.
Mariquita	France	The chasse-marée ran aground on the Goodwin Sands, Kent, United Kingdom. She was on a voyage from Antwerp, Belgium to Le Havre, Seine-Inférieure. She was refloated and taken in to Ramsgate, Kent in a sinking condition.
Mermaid	United Kingdom	The schooner was wrecked on the West Hoyle Bank, in Liverpool Bay. Her crew were rescued. She was on a voyage from Wicklow to Liverpool, Lancashire.
Wicherdina	Prussia	The ship was driven ashore. She was on a voyage from Königsberg to Hull, Yorkshire, United Kingdom. She was refloated.

== 17 December ==
List of shipwrecks: 17 December 1856
Ship	State	Description
Edward Henry	United Kingdom	The barque ran aground at the mouth of the Ebro. She was on a voyage from Marseille, Bouches-du-Rhône, France to Huelva, Spain.
Eliza	United Kingdom	The ship was driven ashore in Tramore Bay. She was on a voyage from Cardiff, Glamorgan to Cork.
Garland	United Kingdom	The full-rigged ship was wrecked at Mahón, Menorca, Spain with the loss of all hands. She was on a voyage from Marseille, Bouches-du-Rhône, France to Algiers, Algeria.
Georgiana	United Kingdom	The ship departed from New York, United States for a British port. No further trace, presumed foundered with the loss of all hands.
Marie Antoinette	France	The ship was wrecked near Sidi Ferruch, Algeria with the loss of all but two of her crew. She was on a voyage from Cette, Hérault to Algiers, Algeria.
Napoleon III	France	The brig was driven ashore and wrecked at Sidi Ferruch with the loss of two of her crew. She was on a voyage from Newcastle upon Tyne, Northumberland, United Kingdom to Algiers.
Santa Maria	France	The brig sprang a leak and sank at Algiers.
Undaunted	United Kingdom	The brig was driven ashore and wrecked at Algiers.

== 18 December ==
List of shipwrecks: 18 December 1856
Ship	State	Description
Edward and Ann	United Kingdom	The brig was driven ashore at Valencia, Spain. Her crew were rescued.
Idas	United Kingdom	The ship caught fire at Liverpool, Lancashire and was scuttled.
Lord Clarendon	United Kingdom	The ship sank in the Bosphorus. She was on a voyage from Taganrog, Russia to Marseille, Bouches-du-Rhône, France.

== 19 December ==
List of shipwrecks: 19 December 1856
Ship	State	Description
George and Mary	United Kingdom	The ship was driven ashore at Wells-next-the-Sea, Norfolk. She was on a voyage from Wells-next-the-Sea to Seaham, County Durham. She was refloated on 21 December and taken in to Wells-next-the-Sea.
New York	United States	The ship was driven ashore near Manasquan, New Jersey. All 307 people on board were rescued by rocket apparatus. She was on a voyage from Liverpool, Lancashire, United Kingdom to New York.
Tasso	(United Kingdom of Great Britain and Ireland) British North America	The barque was wrecked near the Barnegat Inlet, New Jersey, United States with the loss of four of her crew and two rescuers.

== 20 December ==
List of shipwrecks: 20 December 1856
Ship	State	Description
Brothers	United Kingdom	The ship ran aground near Douglas, Isle of Man. She was on a voyage from Runcorn, Cheshire to Newry, County Antrim.
Clarita	United Kingdom	The brig was wrecked at Veracruz, Mexico.
Edgecombe	United Kingdom	The ship was wrecked on "Quayquapu". She was on a voyage from Liverpool, Lancashire to the Rio de la Hacha.
Estrella	Mexico	The pilot boat was wrecked at Veracruz.
Fortune	France	The barque was wrecked at Veracruz.
Guadeloupe	Mexican Navy	The paddle frigate sank at Veracruz.
Iturbide	Mexican Navy	The steamship was wrecked at Veracruz with the loss of 72 of the 89 people on board.
Inca	United States	The ship was wrecked on the Redwing Rocks. She was on a voyage from New Orleans, Louisiana to New York.
Iris	Rostock	The galiot was wrecked on Skagen, Denmark with the loss of seven of her eight crew; her captain was rescued. She was on a voyage from Sunderland, County Durham, United Kingdom to Rostock.
Levrier	France	The ship was wrecked at "Palmos" with the loss of two of her crew.
Marie and Minde or Marie Min	Denmark	The ship was stranded at "Warrepoer" or "Woruss". She was on a voyage from Leith, Lothian, United Kingdom to "Skielskior" (Skælskør?).
Nenuphar	United States	The brig was wrecked at Veracruz.
Rimac	Kingdom of Sardinia	The barque was wrecked at Veracruz.
Thomas C. Sawyer	United States	The ship departed from Philadelphia, Pennsylvania. No further trace, presumed foundered with the loss of all hands.

== 21 December ==
List of shipwrecks: 21 December 1856
Ship	State	Description
Bream	United Kingdom	The ship was wrecked in the Berry Islands, Bahamas. She was on a voyage from Saint John, New Brunswick, British North America to Matanzas, Cuba.
Christian	Sweden	The brig was discovered derelict in the Mediterranean Sea and was towed in to Marseille, Bouches-du-Rhône, France.
Felicity, and Vanguard	United Kingdom	The barque was run down and sunk in the Clyde by the steamship Vanguard. Felicity was on a voyage from Constantinople, Ottoman Empire to the Clyde. Vanguard ran aground. She was on a voyage from the Clyde to Liverpool, Lancashire.
Hilda	Sweden	The ship was driven ashore and wrecked at Klitmøller, Denmark. Her crew were rescued. She was on a voyage from Hull, Yorkshire, United Kingdom to Copenhagen, Denmark.
Mary Ann	United Kingdom	The schooner ran aground on the Scroby Sands, Norfolk and sank. Her crew were rescued by John Wesley (United Kingdom. Mary Ann was on a voyage from West Hartlepool, County Durham to Southwold, Suffolk.
Martha's Vineyard	United States	The ship ran aground in the Clyde whilst trying to navigate past the wrecked of Felicity (United Kingdom).
St. James	United States	The full-rigged ship was driven ashore in the George's River. She was on a voyage from Thomastown, Mississippi to New York.

== 22 December ==
List of shipwrecks: 22 December 1856
Ship	State	Description
Alma	United Kingdom	The brig was driven ashore at Westkapelle, Belgium. She was on a voyage from Sunderland, County Durham, to Antwerp, Belgium. she was refloated and taken in to Antwerp.
Henry and Elizabeth	United Kingdom	The brig was driven ashore and wrecked at Ostend, West Flanders, Belgium. Her crew were rescued. She was on a voyage from Sunderland to Bruges, West Flanders.
Kate	United Kingdom	The schooner was driven ashore at Formby, Lancashire. She was on a voyage from Quebec City, Province of Canada, British North America to Liverpool, Lancashire. She was refloated on 28 January 1857 and towed in to Liverpool.
Marie Jeanette	Netherlands	The ship foundered off the coast of Cornwall, United Kingdom with the loss of all but two of her crew. Survivors were rescued by a fishing boat. She was on a voyage from Rotterdam, South Holland to Akyab, Burma.
Paramatta	United Kingdom	The ship was sighted in the Atlantic Ocean whilst on a voyage from Gibraltar to Charleston, South Carolina, United States. No further trace, presumed foundered with the loss of all hands.

== 23 December ==
List of shipwrecks: 23 December 1856
Ship	State	Description
Anita	United Kingdom	The steamship foundered off Savanilla, Republic of New Granada with the loss of twelve of her 24 crew. Survivors were rescued by Estrella (Spain). Anita was on a voyage from Savanilla, Republic of New Granada to London.
Galatea	United Kingdom	The brig ran aground on the Herd Sand, in the North Sea off the coast of County Durham. Her crew were rescued by the North Shields Lifeboat. She was on a voyage from Rotterdam, South Holland, Netherlands to South Shields, County Durham. Galatea was refloated the next day and towed in to South Shields.
Gipsey	United Kingdom	The ship ran aground at the Fort of São Lourenço do Bugio, Lisbon, Portugal. She was refloated.
Hercules	Wismar	The ship was wrecked near Höganäs, Sweden. She was on a voyage from South Shields, County Durham to Wismar.
John G. Hecksher	United States	The ship foundered in the Atlantic Ocean 25 nautical miles (46 km) north of Anguilla. She was on a voyage from New York, United States to London, United Kingdom.
Seagull	Norway	The brig caught fire and was scuttled at Venice, Kingdom of Lombardy–Venetia with the loss of two of her crew.
Shepperd	United Kingdom	The schooner ran aground at Margate, Kent. She was on a voyage from Middlesbrough, Yorkshire to Margate. She was refloated and taken in to Margate in a leaky condition.
Tasmania	United Kingdom	The steamship ran aground on the Englishman's Bank, in the Black Sea. She was on a voyage from London to Odesa. She was refloated on 29 December and taken in to Odesa in a leaky condition.
William Heath	United States	The brigantine was wrecked in Robin's Bay. She was on a voyage from Saint Thomas, Virgin Islands to Ocho Rios, Jamaica.

== 24 December ==
List of shipwrecks: 24 December 1856
Ship	State	Description
Briton	United Kingdom	The ship was driven ashore at Rhyl, Denbighshire.
Eliza	United Kingdom	The barque ran aground and was damaged at Demerara, British Guiana. She was on a voyage from Demerara to Queenstown, County Cork. She was refloated and taken in to Demerara.
Mary Parry	United Kingdom	The ship sank at Rhyl.
Rover's Bride	United Kingdom	The ship was abandoned in the Atlantic Ocean. Her crew were rescued by Shakespeare (United Kingdom). Rover's Bride was on a voyage from Savannah, Georgia, United States to Liverpool, Lancashire.
Sarah Ann	United Kingdom	The schooner ran aground on the North Bank, in Liverpool Bay and was abandoned by her crew. She was refloated with assistance from the tug Independence (United Kingdom) and taken in to Liverpool, Lancashire.

== 25 December ==
List of shipwrecks: 25 December 1856
Ship	State	Description
Industry	United Kingdom	The ship was driven ashore at San Cipriano d'Aversa, Kingdom of the Two Sicilies. She was on a voyage from Dartmouth, Devon to San Cipriano d'Aversa.
Metropolitan	United Kingdom	The steamship ran aground in the Clyde at Port Glasgow, Renfrewshire. She was on a voyage from Glasgow, Renfrewshire to London. She was refloated the next day and resumed her voyage on 27 December.
Ringdove	United Kingdom	The ship was wrecked near Gibraltar with the loss of nine of her fourteen crew. She was on a voyage from Sunderland, County Durham, to Cartagena, Spain.
St. Lawrence	United Kingdom	The brig was wrecked on the North Rocks, near Hartlepool, County Durham with the loss of all ten crew.
Welsford	United Kingdom	The ship was wrecked near Cape Race, Newfoundland, British North America with the loss of all but three of her 26 crew. She was on a voyage from Saint John, New Brunswick, British North America to Liverpool, Lancashire.

== 26 December ==
List of shipwrecks: 26 December 1856
Ship	State	Description
Dolphin	United Kingdom	The ship was driven ashore and severely damaged at Gibraltar. She was later refloated.
Earl of Seafield	United Kingdom	The schooner was driven ashore at Lossiemouth, Moray. Her four crew survived. She was on a voyage from South Shields, County Durham to Beauly, Inverness-shire.
Earl of Wemyss	United Kingdom	The brig ran aground on the Stoney Binks, in the North Sea off the mouth of the Humber. Her crew were rescued by the Spurn Lifeboat. Earl of Wemyss was on a voyage from London to Hartlepool, County Durham. She floated the next day and collided with a brig and then with Liberty (United Kingdom), which put a skeleton crew on board. She was taken in to Grimsby, Lincolnshire.
Fly	United Kingdom	The schooner was reported to have foundered in the North Sea between North Sunderland, County Durham and the Farne Islands, Northumberland. She was on a voyage from Sunderland, County Durham, to Arbroath, Forfarshire. Also reported to have out in to South Shields, County Durham on 27 December.
Flying Dutchman	United Kingdom	The brig foundered in the North Sea off Bamburg Castle Northumberland. The wreck broke up on 10 January 1857.
Isabella	United Kingdom	The ship ran aground on the Holm Sand, in the North Sea off the coast of Suffolk. She was on a voyage from London to Newcastle upon Tyne, Northumberland. She was refloated and taken in to Lowestoft, Suffolk.
Jersey	United States	The ship was driven ashore 3 nautical miles (5.6 km) south of Cape Henry, Virginia. She was on a voyage from Callao, Peru to Baltimore, Maryland.
Louis A. Surette	United Kingdom	The schooner was wrecked at Cranberry Head, Nova Scotia, British North America with the loss of two of her crew. She was on a voyage from Boston, Massachusetts, United States to Argyll.
Osprey	United Kingdom	The steamship ran aground at West Hartlepool, County Durham. She was on a voyage from Hamburg to West Hartlepool. She was refloated and taken in to West Hartlepool, where she sank. Osprey was refloated on 9 January.
Panope	Greece	The iron gunboat was stranded in the Bay of Cobas, near Ferrol, Spain on her delivery voyage from Port Glasgow and Queenstown, Ireland to Greece.
Stag	United Kingdom	The brig struck the St. Estève Rock, off the Château d'If, Marseille, Bouches-du-Rhône, Franc and sank. Her crew were rescued.
Thornton	United Kingdom	The ship was driven ashore in the River Mersey at Rock Ferry, Cheshire. She was on a voyage from New York, United States to Liverpool, Lancashire. She was refloated and taken in to Liverpool.
Weldaad	Netherlands	The ship was driven ashore at Colberg. She was on a voyage from Danzig to London. She was refloated on 29 December and taken in to "Colbermünde".

== 27 December ==
List of shipwrecks: 27 December 1856
Ship	State	Description
Banff	United Kingdom	The schooner was driven ashore at Redcar, Yorkshire with the loss of all hands.
Bee	United Kingdom	The ship was driven ashore at Lindisfarne, Northumberland. She was refloated and taken in to Arbroath, Forfarshire.
Concordia	United Kingdom	The schooner ran aground on the Brake Sand, in the North Sea. She was on a voyage from London to Ribadesella, Spain. She floated off but consequently sank off Deal, Kent. Her crew survived. Concordia was refloated on 31 December and taken in to Ramsgate, Kent.
Janette	United Kingdom	The ship was driven ashore at Cromarty. She was on a voyage from Brora, Sutherland to Newcastle upon Tyne, Northumberland.
John G. Hecksoer	United States	The schooner was abandoned 50 nautical miles (93 km) north of Anguilla and subsequently sank. She was on a voyage from New York to London.
Ontario	United Kingdom	The ship ran aground at Liverpool, Lancashire. She was refloated the next day and found to be leaky.
Phoenix	Denmark	The schooner was driven ashore and wrecked on Læsø. She was on a voyage from Kalundborg to Leith, Lothian, United Kingdom.
Trafalgar	United Kingdom	The ship was driven ashore at Thornham, Norfolk. Her crew survived. She was on a voyage from Sunderland, County Durham, to Shoreham-by-Sea, Sussex.
Wanges	United Kingdom	The ship ran aground on the Banks Sand, in the North Sea off the coast of Lincolnshire. She was on a voyage from London to Hartlepool, County Durham. She was refloated and assisted in to Grimsby, Lincolnshire.

== 28 December ==
List of shipwrecks: 28 December 1856
Ship	State	Description
Accord	United Kingdom	The ship was driven ashore and wrecked at "Hornbeck", Denmark.
Edmund	United Kingdom	The ship abandoned in the North Sea. Her captain was rescued by Scottish Maid (United Kingdom); the rest of the crew took to the longboat.
Fanny Huntley	United Kingdom	The brig struck the pier and sank at Whitby, Yorkshire. She was on a voyage from Hull, Yorkshire to Middlesbrough, Yorkshire.

== 29 December ==
List of shipwrecks: 29 December 1856
Ship	State	Description
Annie Laurie	United Kingdom	The ship was driven ashore and wrecked in the Petite Passage. She was on a voyage from Saint John, New Brunswick, British North America to Queenstown, County Cork.
Auburn	(United Kingdom of Great Britain and Ireland) British North America	The ship was abandoned in the Atlantic Ocean. Her crew were rescued. She was on a voyage from Philadelphia, Pennsylvania, United States to Jamaica.
Aurora	United Kingdom	The ship was driven ashore at "Hornbeck", Denmark. She was on a voyage from Riga, Russia to Kirkcaldy, Fife. She was refloated on 8 January 1857 and towed in to Helsingør, Denmark.
Ella	Bremen	The ship was wrecked on the Longsand, in the North Sea off the coast of Essex, United Kingdom. Her crew were rescued. She was on a voyage from Bremen to Batavia, Netherlands East Indies.
Francis	United Kingdom	The ship was driven ashore at Douglas, Isle of Man.
Mary Ann	United Kingdom	The barque sank in Rhos Bay. Her crew were rescued by the Rhyl Lifeboat. She was on a voyage from Liverpool, Lancashire to Gibraltar.
Ricardo	Hamburg	The brig was wrecked on the Blanquillas Reef, off the coast of Mexico.
Tribune	United Kingdom	The ship was driven ashore at Cardiff, Glamorgan. She was on a voyage from Bristol, Gloucestershire to Cádiz, Spain.

== 30 December ==
List of shipwrecks: 30 December 1856
Ship	State	Description
Charles McLaughlin	United Kingdom	The ship was driven ashore and wrecked at Breaksea Point, Glamorgan. She was on a voyage from Cardiff, Glamorgan to Martinique.
Garricks	United Kingdom	The full-rigged ship was driven ashore at Breaksea Point. She was on a voyage from Antwerp, Belgium to Cardiff.
Rosina	United Kingdom	The brig was wrecked near Hanko, Grand Duchy of Finland.
Superior	United Kingdom	The ship was driven ashore and wrecked at Breaksea Point.

== 31 December ==
List of shipwrecks: 31 December 1856
Ship	State	Description
Halcyon	United Kingdom	The sloop was wrecked on a reef 3 nautical miles (5.6 km) south of Saint Croix, Virgin Islands. All on board survives. She was on a voyage from Saint Kitts to Saint Thomas, Virgin Islands.

== Unknown date ==
List of shipwrecks: Unknown date in December 1856
Ship	State	Description
Algomah	United States	The 114-foot-9-inch (35 m), 269.14-gross register ton brig collided with the schooner Storm King (United States) in the harbor at Milwaukee, Wisconsin, and sank. She was refloated, repaired, and returned to service.
Alma	United Kingdom	The ship foundered in the Black Sea. Her crew were rescued. She was on a voyage from Galaţi, Ottoman Empire to Marseille, Bouches-du-Rhône, France.
Capitol	United States	The ship was abandoned in the Atlantic Ocean. Her crew were rescued by Horizon (United Kingdom). Capitol was on a voyage from Baltimore, Maryland to Liverpool, Lancashire, United Kingdom.
Carlsbad	Sweden	The brig sank at "Le Frioul", southern France. Her crew were rescued.
Castor	France	The steamship was driven ashore on the coast of Sardinia.
Crawfords	United Kingdom	The ship was driven ashore at Málaga, Spain. She was on a voyage from Newcastle upon Tyne, Northumberland to Málaga.
Ellis	United Kingdom	The ship foundered in the Atlantic Ocean before 11 December. She was on a voyage from Toronto, Province of Canada, British North America to Hull, Yorkshire.
Inga	Denmark	The ship was wrecked Domsten, Sweden.
John Currier	United Kingdom	The ship was driven ashore on Phoenix Island, United States. She was on a voyage from Mobile, Alabama, United States to Liverpool. She was refloated on 10 December but subsequently broke up.
John Garrow	United Kingdom	The ship was abandoned in the Atlantic Ocean. Her crew were rescued by E. Z. (United Kingdom). John Garrow was on a voyage from Savannah, Georgia, United States to Liverpool.
Kim Chang Leang	Netherlands East Indies	The barque was wrecked in the Kangean Islands in late December. She was on a voyage from Ampana to Singapore, Straits Settlements.
Lord Clarendon	United Kingdom	The ship was lost off Therapia, Ottoman Empire. She was on a voyage from Taganrog, Russia to Marseille.
Maria Aurelia	Sweden	The ship was driven ashore at Friedrichsort Point, Prussia. She was on a voyage from Stockholm to London. she was refloated on 3 December and found to be severely leaky.
Maria Ross	United Kingdom	The ship was driven ashore at Dundalk, County Louth before 8 December. She was on a voyage from Liverpool, Lancashire to Newry, County Antrim. She was refloated.
Mercurius	Netherlands	The barque was driven ashore on the north coast of "Bintang", Netherlands East Indies with the loss of about 100 lives. She was on a voyage from Amoy, China to Singapore, Straits Settlements.
Rosalie	France	The ship foundered in the Bay of Biscay 25 nautical miles (46 km) off Bayonne, Basses-Pyrénées before 25 December. Her crew were rescued. .
Sarah and Margaret	United Kingdom	The ship ran aground on the Maplin Sand, in the North Sea off the coast of Essex. She was on a voyage from Saint Petersburg, Russia to London. She was refloated on 4 December.
Scotland	United Kingdom	The ship ran aground on a reef off "Wango Wango Island". She was on a voyage from China to Bombay, India. She was refloated two days later and completed her voyage, arriving at Bombay on 17 December.
Stad Tiel	Netherlands	The ship was lost before 10 December. She was on a voyage from Hong Kong to Batavia, Netherlands East Indies.
Statira	United Kingdom	The ship ran aground on the Pennington Spit, in the River Mersey.
Stephen J. Young	United Kingdom	The ship was abandoned in the Atlantic Ocean. Her crew were rescued by Jane Lovett (United Kingdom). Stephen J. Young was on a voyage from St. Stephen, New Brunswick, British North America to Liverpool.
Storm King	United States	The schooner collided with the brig Algomah (United States) in the harbor at Milwaukee, Wisconsin, and sank.
Swift	United Kingdom	The ship was wrecked in the Strait of Scio before 4 December. She was on a voyage from Smyrna, Ottoman Empire to "Maratonise".
Thomas and Elizabeth	United Kingdom	The ship was wrecked on the Dojor Kossa, in the Black Sea before 17 December. Her crew were rescued.
