= São Julião Lighthouse =

São Julião Lighthouse Farol de São Julião
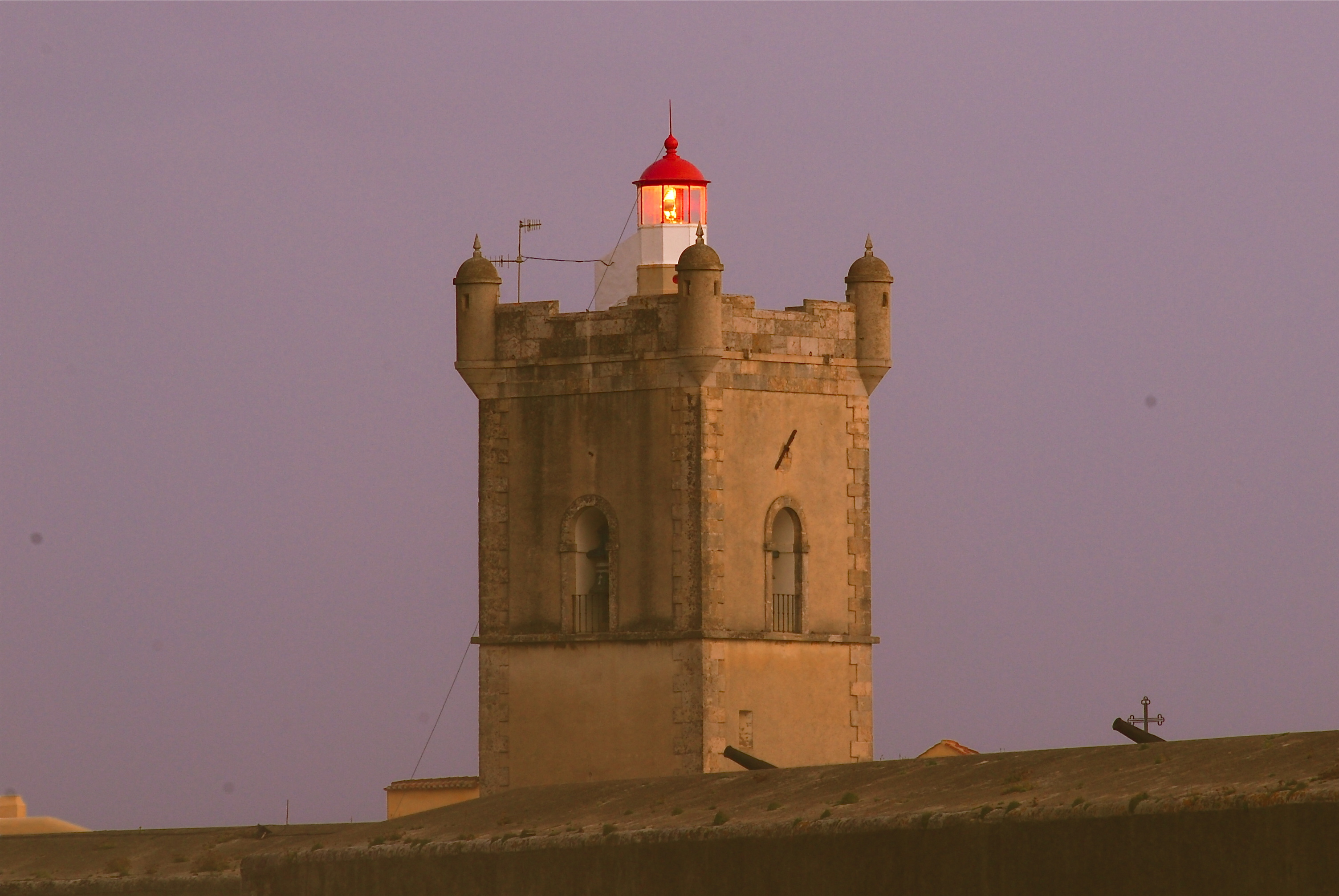
- Location: Oeiras, Lisbon District, Portugal
- Coordinates: 38°40′28.09″N 9°19′31.19″W

Tower
- Constructed: 1775
- Construction: stone
- Automated: 1980
- Height: 24 metres (79 ft)
- Heritage: Immovable Cultural Heritage of Public Interest

Light
- Focal height: 39 metres (128 ft)
- Lens: Fresnel Lamp of 4th Order 250mm
- Range: 14 nautical miles
- Characteristic: Oc R 5s

The São Julião Lighthouse is located in the fort of the same name, which is the largest sea defence structure in Portugal and is situated on a headland on the north bank of the River Tagus estuary in Oeiras, Lisbon District. It is a square masonry tower and the lantern is painted white, with a red dome.

== History ==
The fort of São Julião da Barra was constructed primarily for defence and follows an irregular pentagonal design. Today it is the national headquarters of the Ministry of National Defence and official residence of the Minister. In 1758 orders were given to build a lighthouse in the fort. However, it is possible that an earlier lighthouse had existed from 1553 but that it was destroyed by the 1755 Lisbon earthquake. The work initially involved building a stone lantern in 1761 but in 1775 an Argand lamp with a parabolic reflector was installed. Between 1848 and 1865 modernization work was carried out and a 4th Order Fresnel lens was installed, producing a fixed white light, fuelled with gas distilled from wood. From 1880 the lighting was obtained from petroleum gas. The lighthouse underwent further repairs in 1893 and 1913. A foghorn was installed in 1916 but almost immediately thereafter operations ceased until 1918 because of the First World War.

In 1933 a red lamp was installed and, at the same time, the lighthouse was connected to the electricity grid. Integrated in the telecontrol network of the approaches of the port of Lisbon, it was automated in 1980, and became remotely controlled. Together with the Bugio lighthouse it marks the entrance or exit of the Lisbon Bar, the Bugio light being green. The São Julião lighthouse is 24 metres tall, with an altitude of 39 metres. It marks the entrance to the port of Lisbon, along with the Bugio lighthouse.

== See also ==
- List of lighthouses in Portugal
- Directorate of Lighthouses, Portugal
