= Fort of Santo Amaro do Areeiro =

17th Century fortress in Portugal

- Oeiras, Lisbon District, Portugal
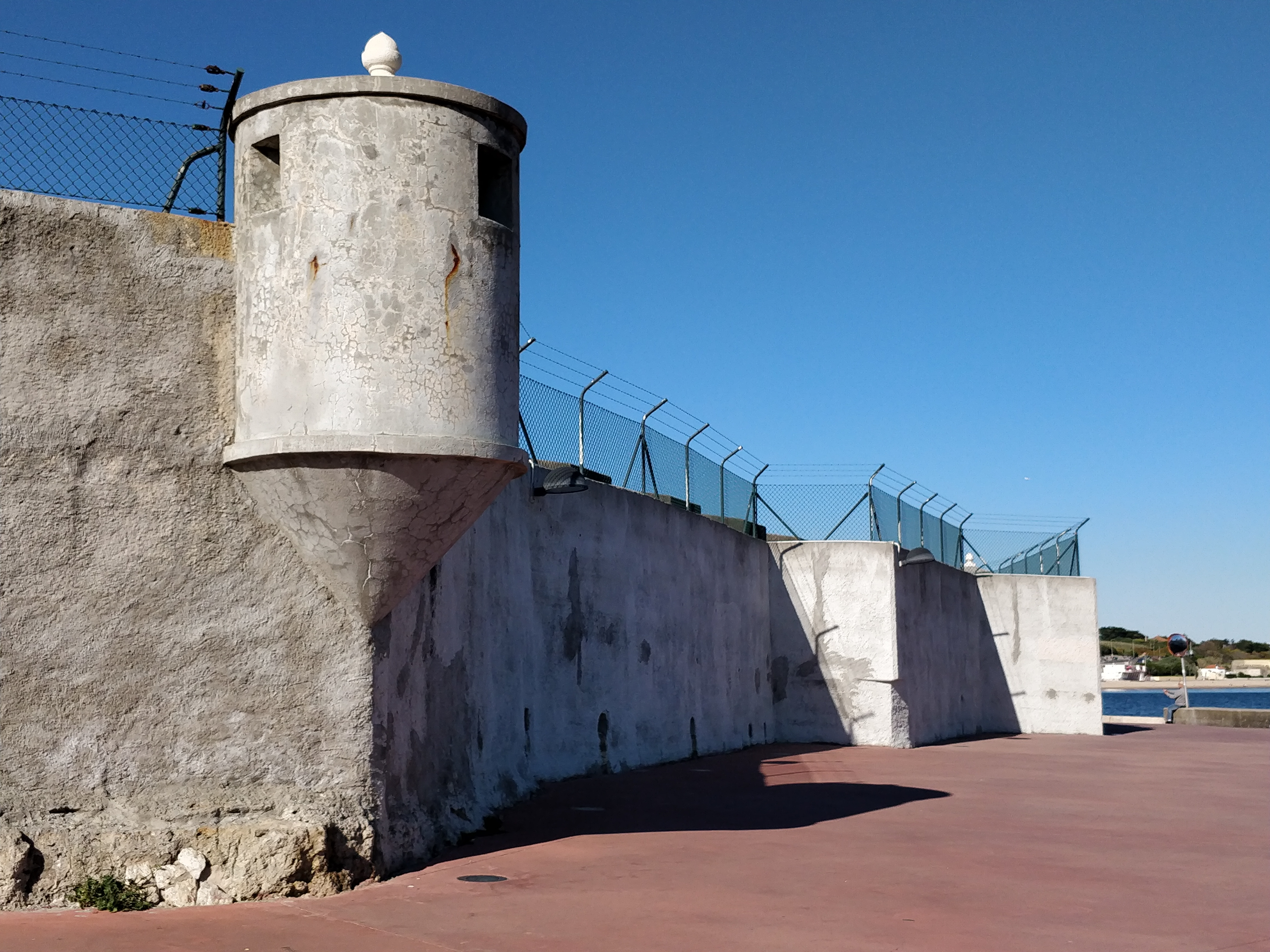
- View of the fort from the sea

Site information
- Type: Bastion fort
- Open to the public: No
- Condition: Restored

Location
- Coordinates: 38°40′53″N 9°18′53″W

Site history
- Built: 1659 with subsequent modifications
- Materials: Basalt

The Fort of Santo Amaro do Areeiro, also known as the Forte Velho (Old fort) or Fort of Areeiro, is located on the right bank of the River Tagus in the municipality of Oeiras in the Lisbon District of Portugal. Construction began in 1647 under the direction of António Luís de Meneses and was completed in 1659.

== History ==
The fort was designed in a polygonal, Mannerist style. It was built during the Portuguese Restoration War (1640-68) on the instructions of King D. João IV, with the purpose of reinforcing the defence of the Tagus estuary already being provided by the nearby Fort of São Julião da Barra and the Fort of São Lourenço do Bugio, situated in the estuary, and thereby controlling access to the capital Lisbon. By 1735 it was reportedly in a bad condition, with the main door needing to be replaced. Further work was deemed urgently required in 1751. It was garrisoned during the Spanish–Portuguese War (1762-63), being armed with seven working cannon.

The Fort of Santo Amaro was decommissioned in 1768 but by the end of the 18th century it again had a garrison, of six gunners with six cannon. Early in the 19th century it was manned by 20 soldiers who were military invalids. The fort was abandoned in 1833 during the Portuguese Civil War (1828-1834). By 1896 it was occupied only by a soldier with his family. During World War II, five families were living in the fort in 1945. Twenty-seven adults and several children were found to be there in 1947. This number amounted to about fifty individuals in 1950, when eviction proceedings were begun. In the late 1950s considerable conservation and improvement work was undertaken and in 1961 and 1962 the fort was used as summer residence of the Minister of the Army. After the Carnation Revolution (1974), which saw the overthrow of the Estado Novo dictatorship, Santo Amaro was used as a place for political meetings. For security reasons an external wall was built, giving a misleading idea of its design from outside. In the 1980s it was used as holiday colony for children of public servants. In December 2010 the government authorized the fort’s sale.
