= Bugio Lighthouse =

Lighthouse in Portugal

Bugio Lighthouse Farol do Bugio
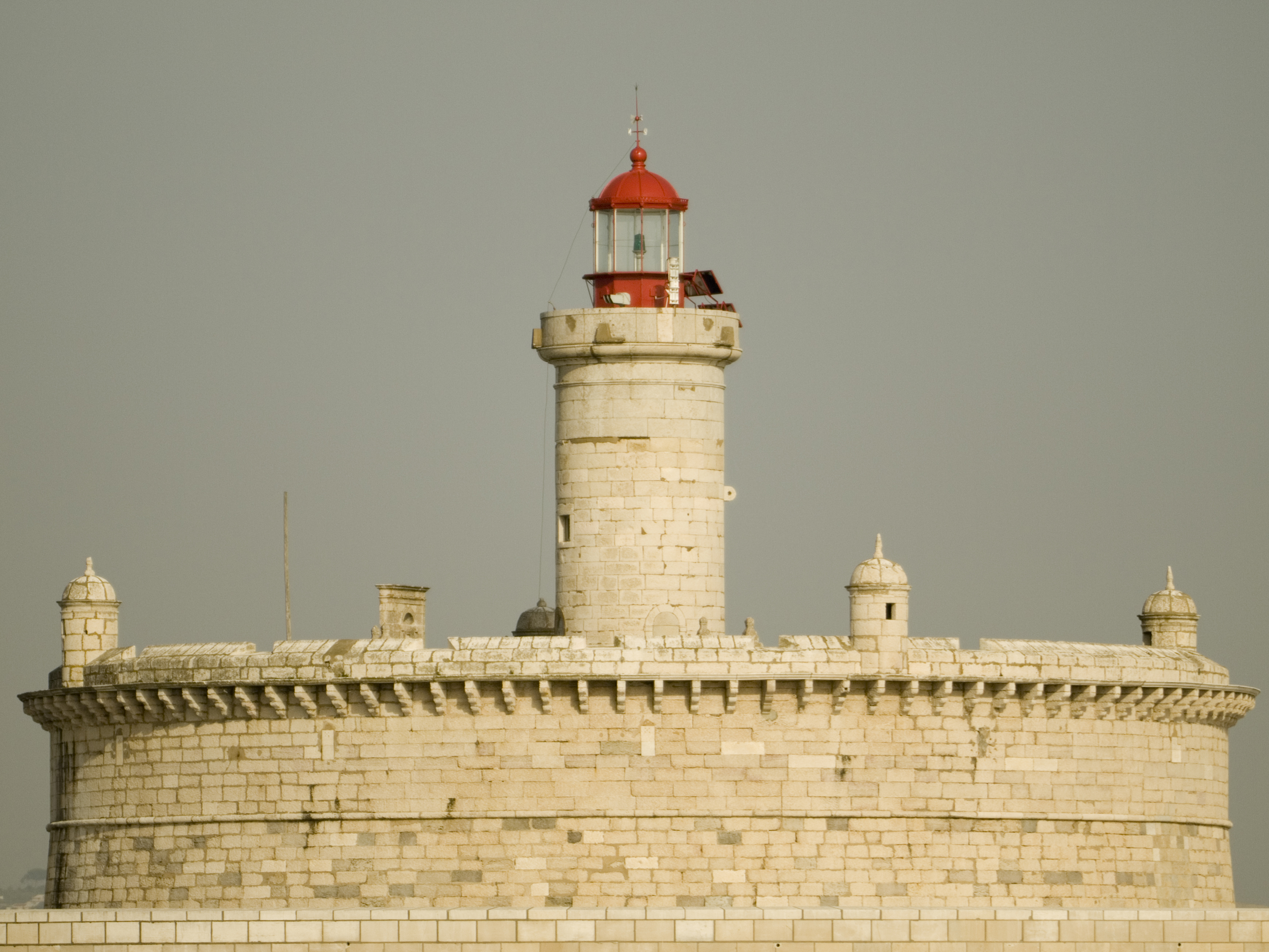
- Location: Oeiras, Lisbon District, Portugal
- Coordinates: 38°39′37″N 9°17′56″W

Tower
- Constructed: 1693-1775
- Automated: 1981
- Height: 14 metres (46 ft)
- Heritage: Immovable Cultural Heritage of Public Interest

Light
- Focal height: 28 metres (92 ft)
- Lens: Vega VLB44 8-tier LED Beacon
- Range: 15 nautical miles
- Characteristic: FI G 5s

The Bugio Lighthouse is situated on an island in the estuary of the River Tagus on the Fort of São Lourenço do Bugio, about ten kilometres west of Lisbon. It falls under the municipality of Oeiras in Lisbon District.

== History ==
Attacks by French and Turkish pirates, especially in 1552 and 1556, demonstrated the need for Portugal to strengthen the defence of Lisbon. This led to the decision to fortify the island of S. Julião da Barra in the River Tagus estuary in 1556. The fort of São Lourenço do Bugio followed in 1590. As early as 1693, the fort is believed to have already possessed a light to aid navigation. An inspection of the lighthouse in 1751 reported that the fire was fuelled with olive oil and operated from October to March. This original lighthouse was destroyed during the 1755 Lisbon earthquake but in 1758, Sebastião José de Carvalho e Melo, 1st Marquis of Pombal ordered the construction of six new lighthouses, including a new one at Bugio. In 1775, the new lighthouse came into operation, illuminated by an Argand lamp with parabolic reflectors. In 1829 a new rotating mechanism driving 16 lamps was installed and in 1896, a 3rd order optics device with a new oil supply was installed.

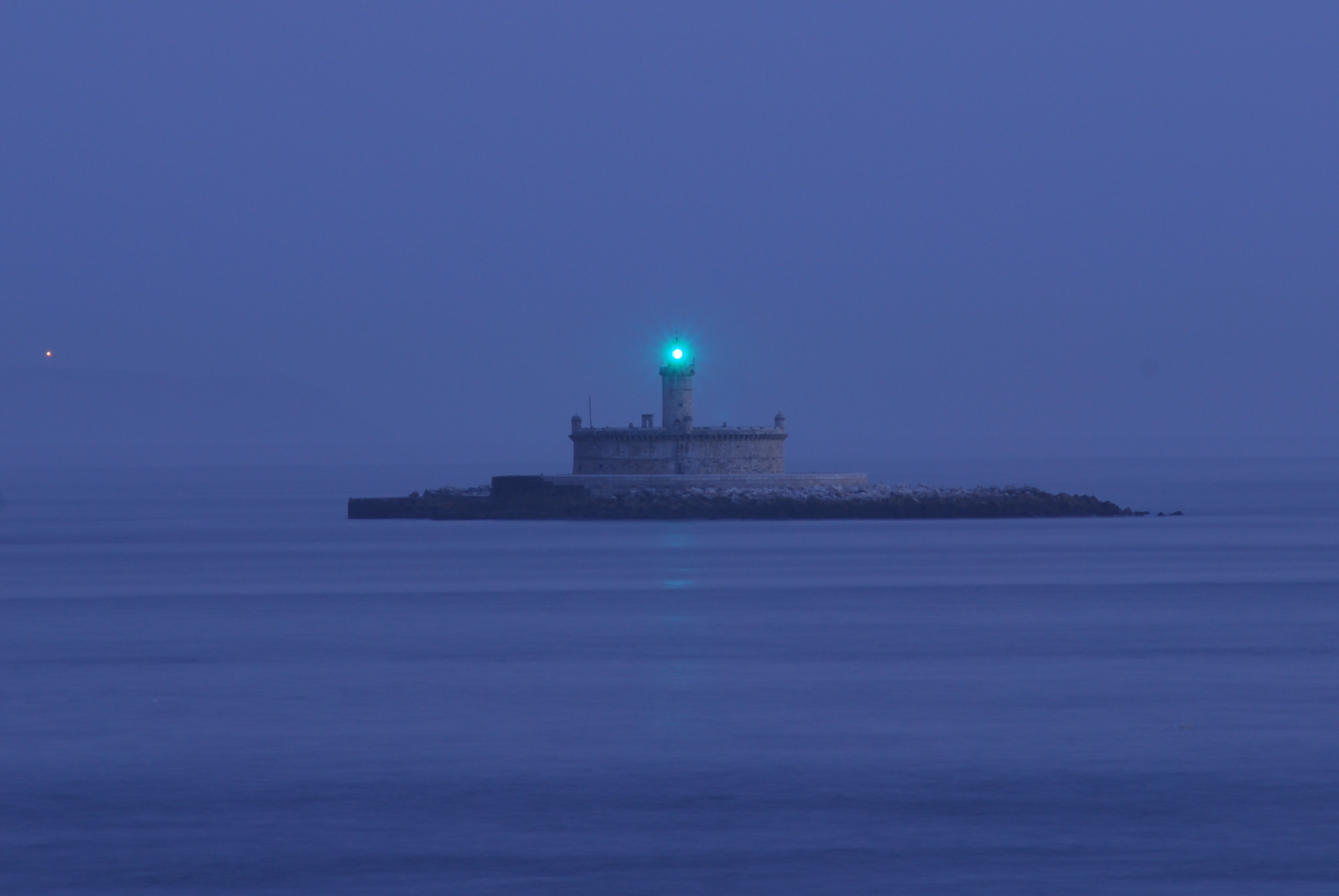
The Bugio Lighthouse with its characteristic green light. To the left can be made out the red light of the São Julião lighthouse. Together, these lights mark the entrance to the port of Lisbon.

During the First World War, the light did not function. In 1923, a new, larger 3rd order optical device was installed. In 1933, after it was decided to replace all fixed lights in Portugal, the lighthouse was changed to a flashing bright green one, a feature that it still has today. In 1946, the fuel was switched to petroleum and the light was electrified with the use of a 500 W / 110 V lamp in 1959, using generators for power. A foghorn was introduced in 1961. In 1981, the light was automated, permitting it to be remotely controlled, and became unmanned the following year. A fog detector was also installed. In 1994, an ML 300 omnidirectional Fresnel lens operating with solar energy replaced the old equipment and a new foghorn was also installed.

Since the fort is located on an island that is very exposed to the action of the sea, it has been necessary to carry out maintenance and consolidation on numerous occasions. There are works documented in 1788, 1804, 1807, 1818, 1952, and 1981. In the winter of 1993, the sea brought down a significant part of the lower platform of the fort, and the situation became more acute in the following years, requiring urgent repair. This was carried out between 1997 and 2001, by which time the tower had been in danger of collapse. In July, 2008, the ML 300 flashlight was removed and replaced with a Vega VLB44 Beacon, together with 4 solar panels, increasing the luminous range to 15 miles. The lighthouse emits a green flash of one second every 5 seconds. It marks the entrance to the port of Lisbon, along with the São Julião lighthouse.

== See also ==
- List of lighthouses in Portugal
- Directorate of Lighthouses, Portugal
