= Fort of São Lourenço do Bugio =

1590 sea fort and lighthouse in Portugal

- Forte de São Lourenço do Bugio
- River Tagus estuary, Lisbon District, Portugal
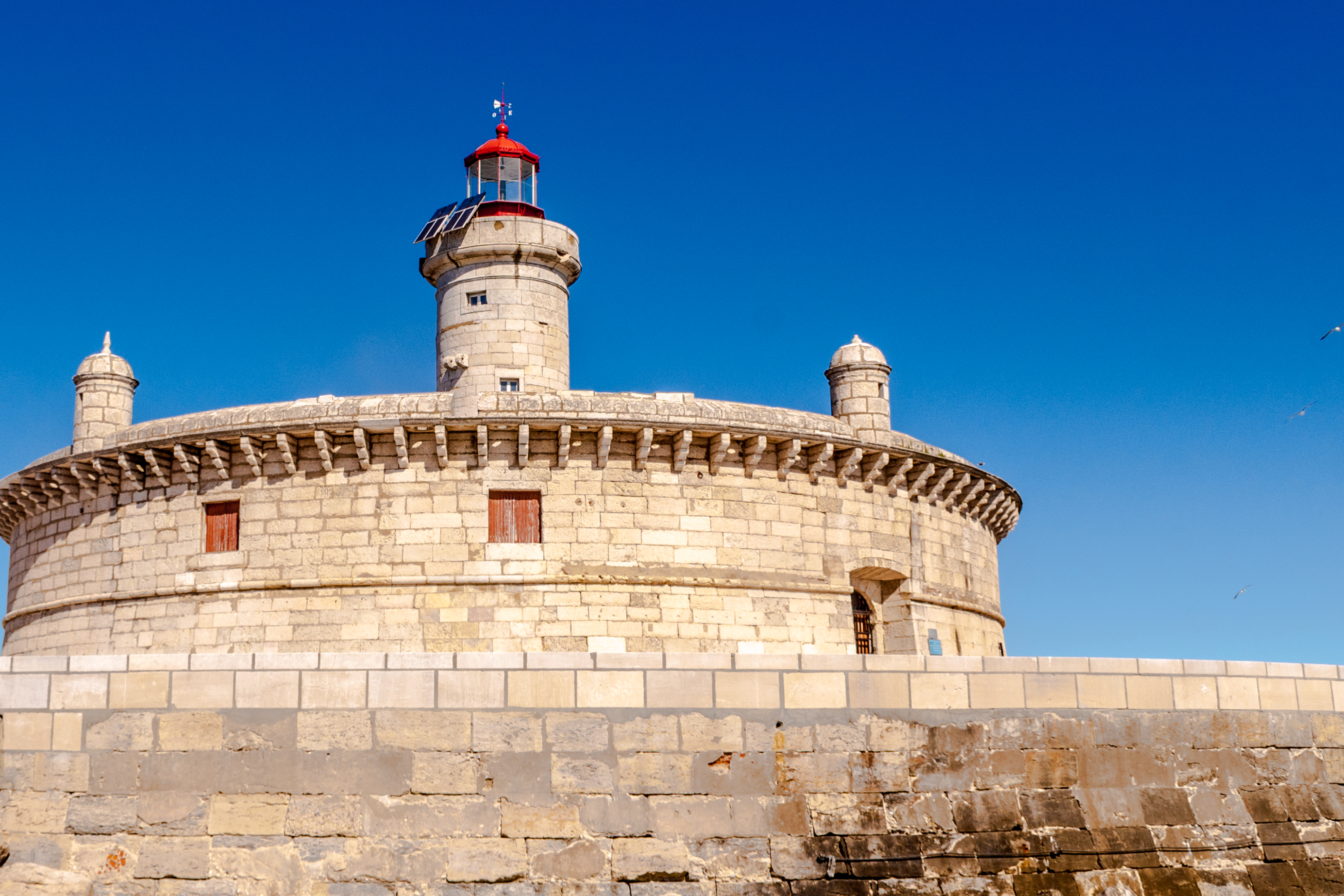

Site information
- Type: Fort
- Owner: Government of Portugal
- Open to the public: No
- Condition: Restored

Location
- Coordinates: 38°39′37″N 9°17′55″W

Site history
- Built: 1590-1657 with subsequent modifications
- Built by: Various
- In use: Lighthouse
- Materials: Basalt
- Battles/wars: Peninsular War, Liberal Wars

The Fort of São Lourenço do Bugio, also known as the fort of São Lourenço da Cabeça Seca (Saint Lawrence of the dry head) or simply Torre do Bugio (Bugio Tower), is located in the middle of the estuary of the river Tagus, near Lisbon in Portugal. With no further need for its military functions, it is presently a lighthouse. The fort's location is on a sandbank formed by the silting of the river mouth, the result of the meeting of the river's waters with those of the Atlantic Ocean. Being the only sandbar of the Tagus river with its surface above the tide throughout the year, it was given the name “dry head”. The derivation of the name “Bugio” (monkey) is uncertain but may be related to the French word for candle, “bougie”, due to the similarity of the fort's structure with a candle on a candlestick.

== Origins ==
The idea of a fortification on the river Tagus to protect the maritime access to Lisbon was first suggested by the architect Francisco de Holanda in the reign of King Sebastian I. The king entrusted Manuel de Almada to erect the structure, with the idea that crossfire would be possible with the then primitive Fort of São Julião da Barra on the north bank of the river, thus protecting the access channels to Lisbon. The initial structure, which was built in 1570, was constructed of wood but due to the shifting sands was not practical. But Lisbon was under a constant threat from pirates and a more substantial stone structure was required.

== Construction ==
During the reign of King Philip I two different design proposals were made by the Italian architect Giovanni Vicenzo Casale; one for a star shape and the other for a circular fort. The latter was considered best able to resist the waves in the estuary and to offer greater ease of mobilization of the artillery. A large number of barges were constructed in order to move blocks of stone from the area near the Fort of São Julião da Barra out to the sandbank. Work began in 1590 but progress was slow and the foundations were not finished until 1601. The fort was only finally completed during the reign of King John IV. He appointed a Portuguese engineer to complete the work in 1643 but it was not finally finished until 1657.

== Battles ==
The fort was significantly damaged by the 1755 Lisbon earthquake. During the Peninsular War, the fort was occupied by Napoleonic troops in 1807 and during the Liberal Wars it was the target of artillery fire from the French fleet under the command of Admiral Albin Roussin. The fort was garrisoned until at least 1911. In the 1930s and 1940s dredging work was carried out in its surroundings. At the end of World War II, it was transferred to the Directorate of Lighthouse Services. Severely damaged by weather and water erosion, it has undergone various repairs since the 1950s but damage remains visible.

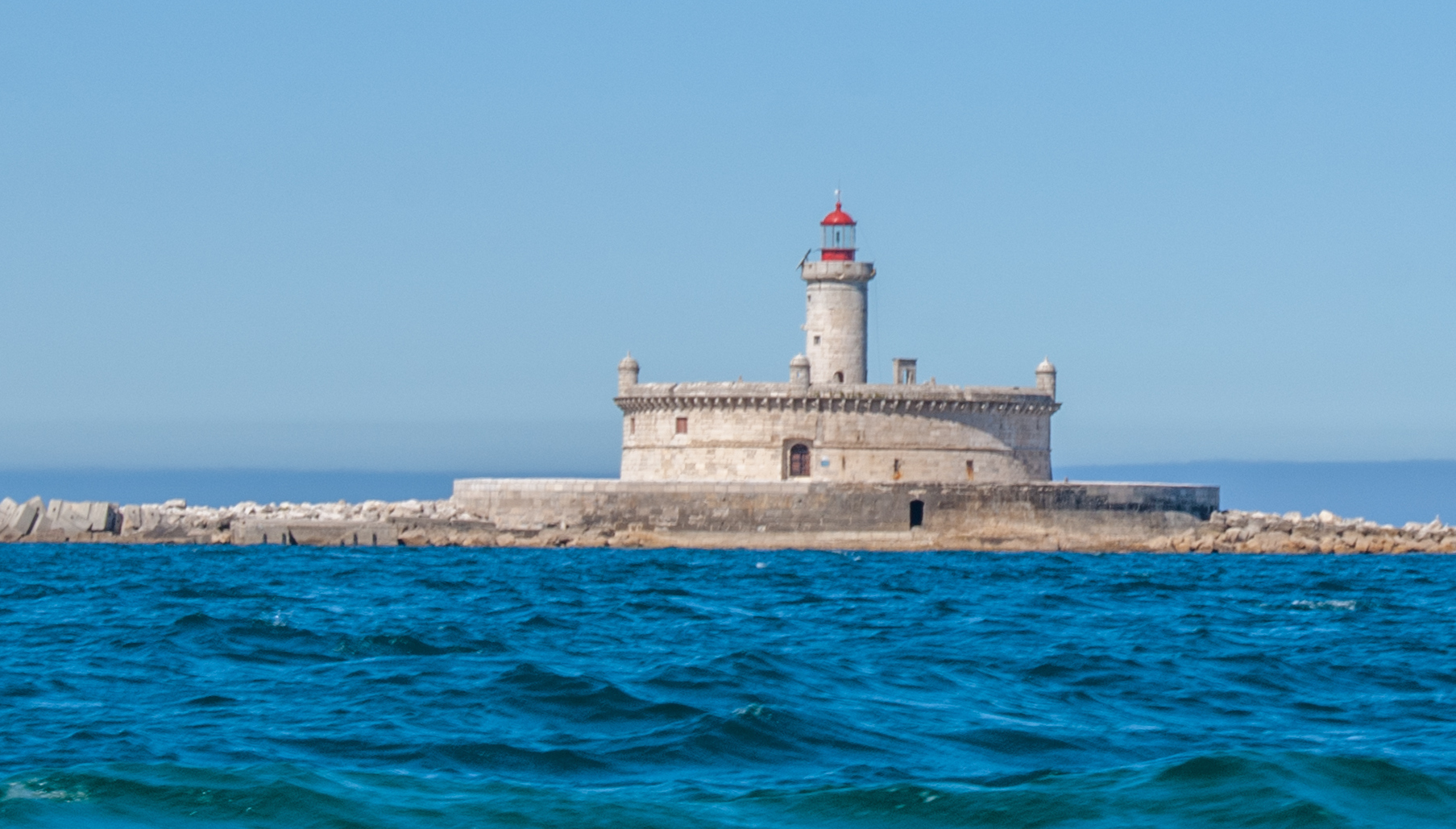
View of the fort

== Structure ==
The structure, considered a model of Renaissance fortification, and believed to have been modelled by the architect on Castel Sant'Angelo in Rome, is perfectly circular, in stone masonry. It consists of an external sloping wall 62 meters in diameter and 6 meters high; an internal wall 33 meters in diameter by 7 meters in height, and a central tower, 3 meters in diameter and 16 meters high, at the top of which is the modern lighthouse. Inside the internal wall are a command post, barracks, storage, a cistern and a chapel.

== See also ==
- Bugio Lighthouse
