= Fort of São Julião da Barra =

16th-century fortress in Portugal

- Forte de São Julião da Barra
- Oeiras, Lisbon District, Portugal
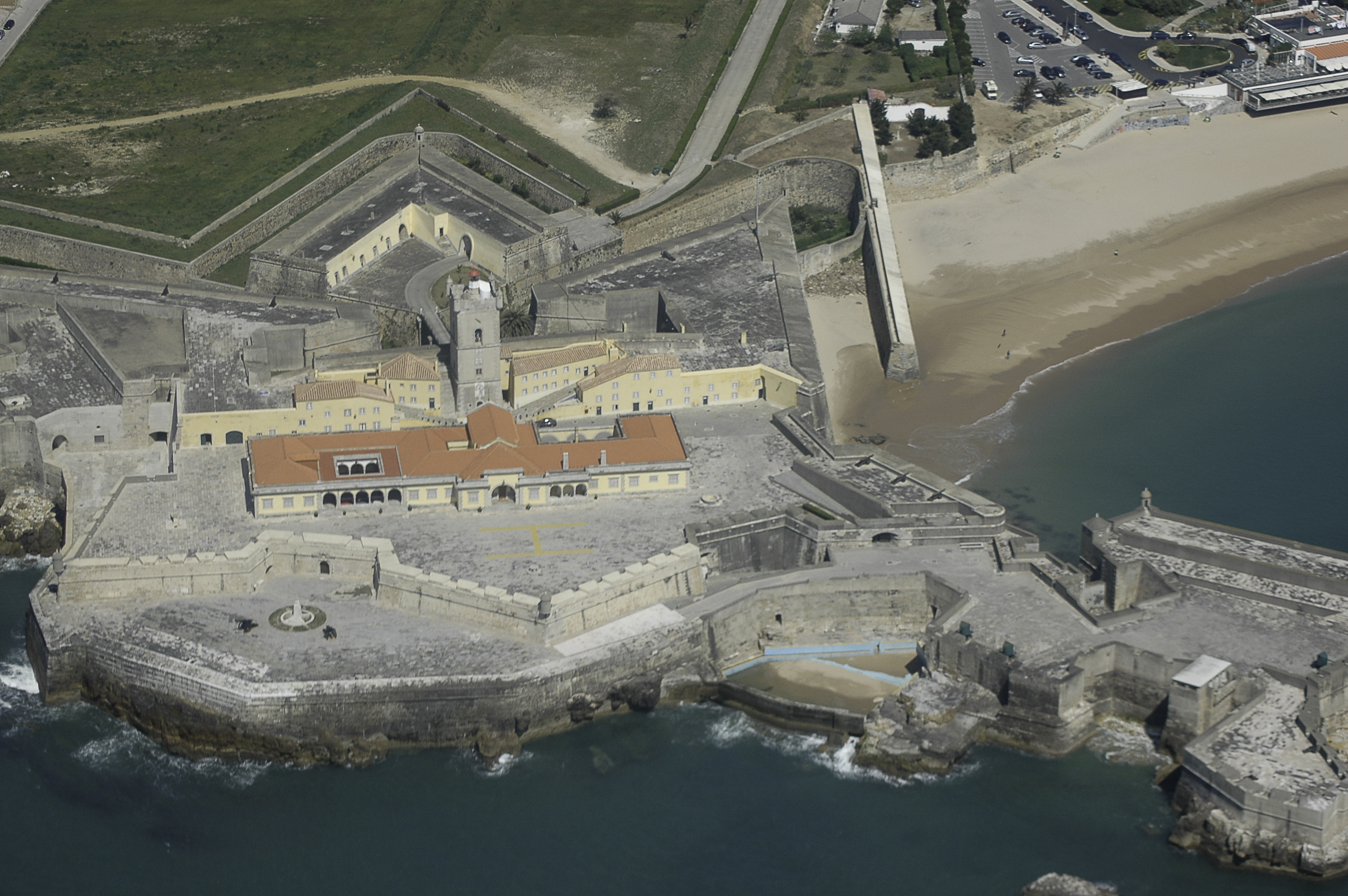

Site information
- Type: Bastion fort
- Open to the public: No (Groups on request)

Location
- Coordinates: 38°40′28″N 9°19′31″W

Site history
- Built: 1553-1568 with subsequent modifications
- Built by: Miguel de Arruda
- In use: For official purposes
- Materials: Basalt

The Fort of São Julião da Barra is the largest and most complete military defence complex in the Vauban style remaining in Portugal. It is located in São Julião da Barra, on the point of São Gião, in the parish of Oeiras e São Julião da Barra, Paço de Arcos e Caxias, Oeiras Municipality, Lisbon District. Considered in the past as the most important maritime fortification in the country, it had originally, together with the Fort of São Lourenço do Bugio, the role of controlling access to the port of Lisbon. It is currently the official residence of the Portuguese Minister of National Defence.

== History ==
Starting from small beginnings, São Julião has been modified, expanded and adapted over several centuries. The construction of a fort on the right bank of the Tagus River was recommended by the King of Portugal, Manuel I, to his son and successor, John III. In 1549 John III created the position of Master of the Works of Fortification of the Kingdom, and initially entrusted the architect, Miguel de Arruda, with construction of several fortified complexes in overseas Portuguese territories. Following a decision that the defence of Lisbon would be best served by a defensive arrangement incorporating several forts, work on the Fort of São Julião da Barra, under the supervision of Arruda, began in 1553 and had been completed by 1568.

The defensive arrangements also incorporated the Tower, later Fort of São Lourenço do Bugio, situated on a sandbank in the middle of the Tagus estuary, and the role of these two forts to protect the entrance to the Lisbon bar were complemented by the Citadel of Cascais, as a first defence at the mouth of the river, and by the Tower of Belém close to Lisbon and the Fort of São Sebastião de Caparica on the left bank, which were seen as a last line of defence. Additional work continued in 1573, when those awaiting deportation and held in the fort's dungeons were used for forced labour. In 1579 a Spanish spy in the service of Philip II of Spain produced a drawing of the fort, which was subsequently attacked from the land by Spanish troops under the command of the Duke of Alba. The garrison surrendered on 13 August 1580.

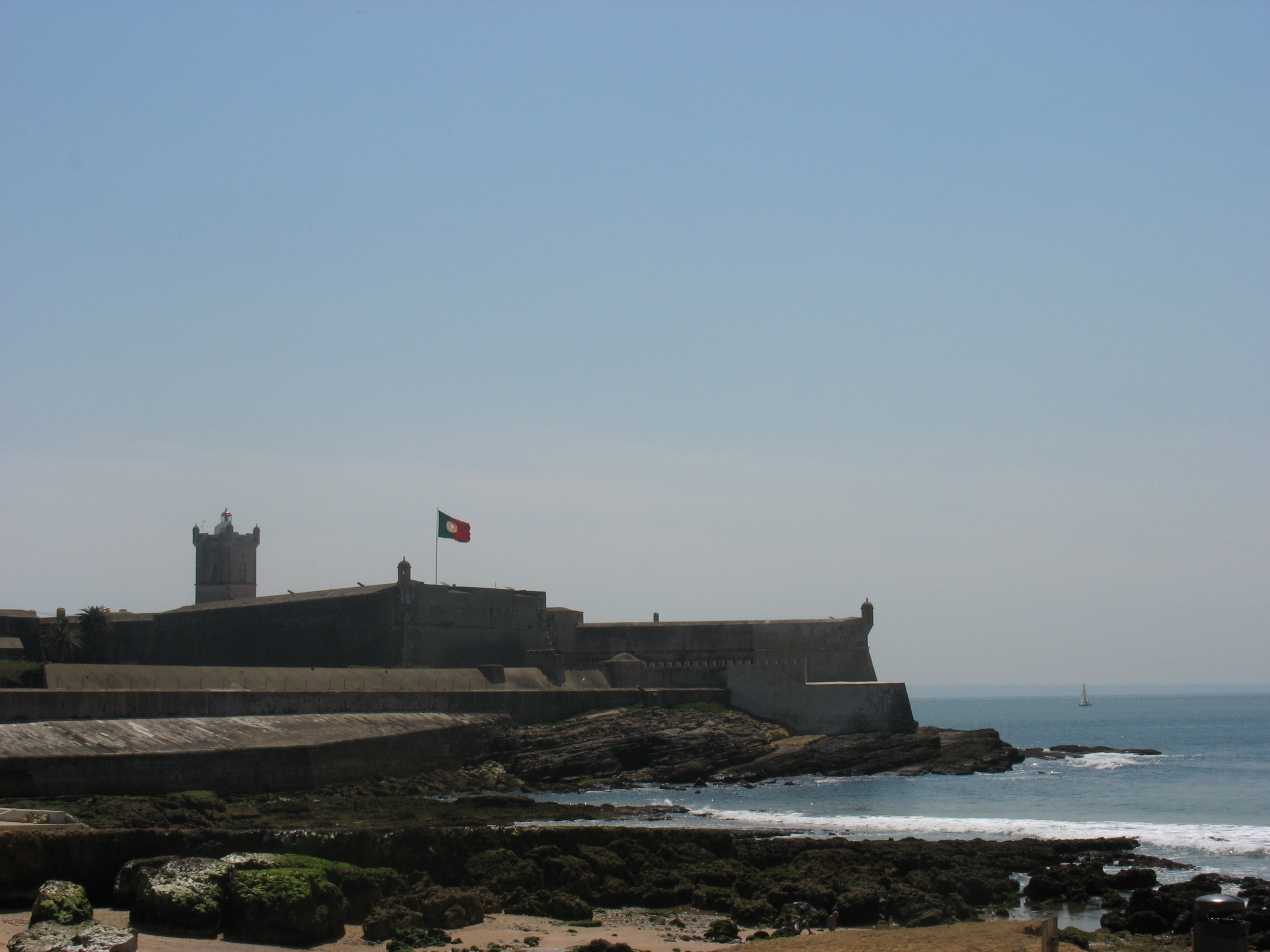

During the Spanish occupation the Duke of Alba planned the reinforcement of the fort, raising new batteries and extending the defenses of the western flank. In 1582 bastions were added to the eastern side. Further enlargement and reinforcement was carried out from 1597. Together, these works transformed São Julião da Barra into the largest and most powerful fort in Portugal. In the same period, the fort began to be used as a political prison, a function that was maintained in the following centuries until the First Portuguese Republic.

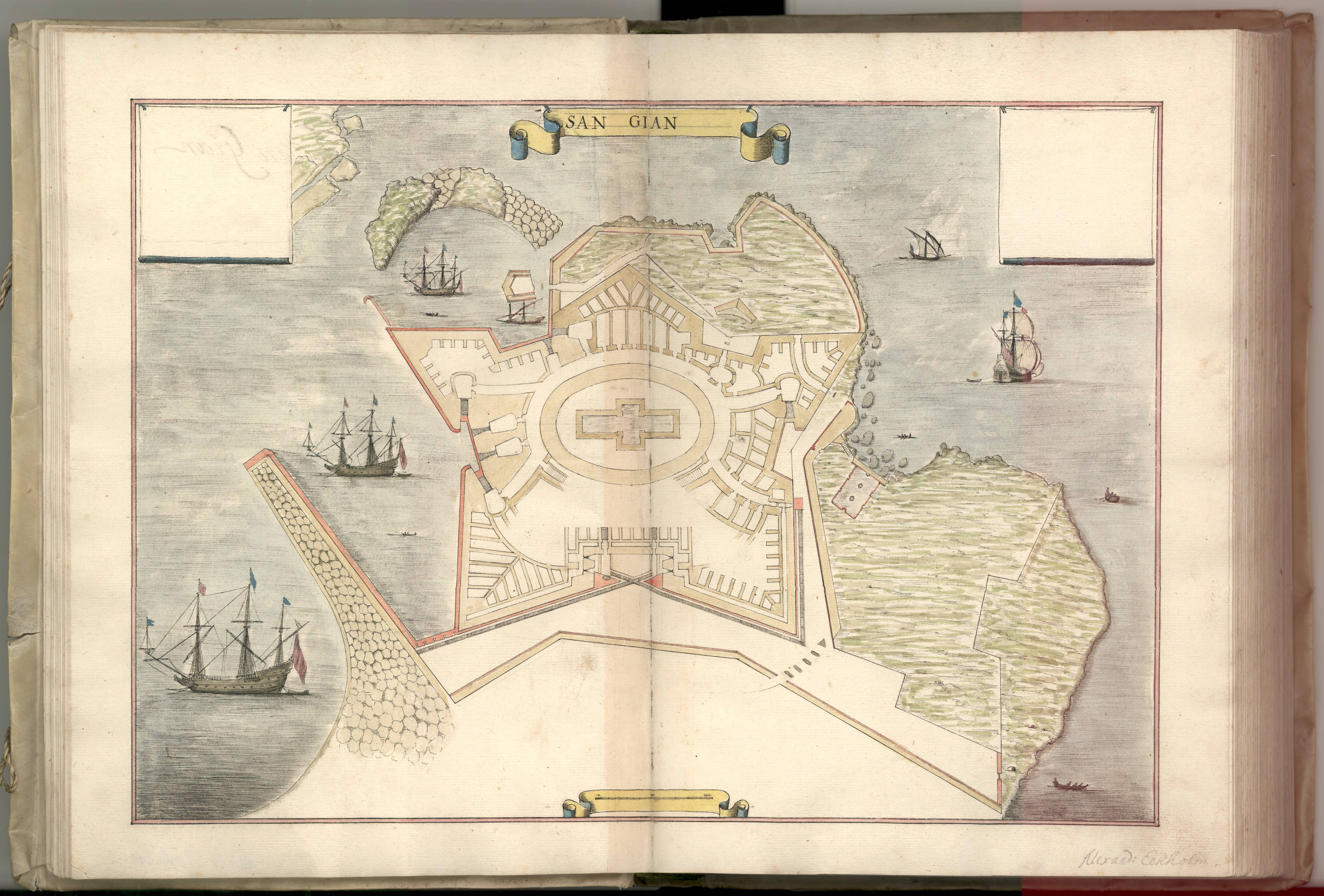
Drawing of the fort as it was in the mid 17th-century.

At the beginning of the Portuguese Restoration War (1640–1668), the fort suffered its second siege, by troops loyal to the Duke of Braganza, who went on to become King John IV of Portugal. Under his reign further repair works were carried out to the fort including construction of barracks and lodgings for the garrison and further defences against attack from the land. Further improvements were implemented in 1751 but in 1755 the fort suffered damage as a result of the Lisbon Earthquake, the most serious being the collapse of the lighthouse tower in the centre of the square. The lighthouse resumed operation in 1761.

At the beginning of the Peninsular War, French troops under the command of General Jean-Andoche Junot reached the limits of Lisbon on 30 November 1807. The fort was transformed into barracks for the French occupation troops under the command of General Jean-Pierre Travot, while the bar of the Tagus River was blocked by the British navy in support of the Portuguese. The fort passed into British hands following the Sintra Convention, on 2 September 1808. In 1809 it was earmarked as the evacuation point for British troops under the command of Arthur Wellesley, 1st Duke of Wellington in the event that British and Portuguese troops were unable to repel a further French invasion. The fort was protected by a series of military works constructed under Wellington's orders and collectively known as the third line of the Lines of Torres Vedras. In 1831, during the Portuguese Civil War (1828-1834), it was the target of artillery fire from the French fleet under the command of Admiral Albin Roussin.

On 22 August 1951, São Julião ceased to be a military fortification and was adapted for the reception of members of the government and accommodation for illustrious visitors. It was used for the reception of General Dwight D. Eisenhower in 1951 and Field Marshal Montgomery in 1952. The German Chancellor, Angela Merkel, was hosted at the fort in November 2012.
