= Peniche Fortress =

16th Century fortress in Portugal

- Praça-forte de Peniche
- Oeste region, Near Peniche in Portugal
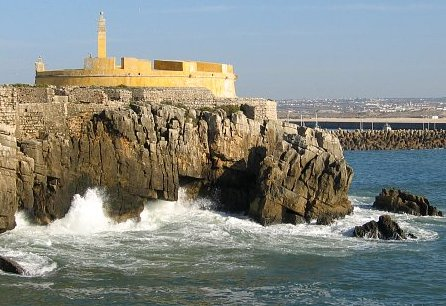
- View of the Peniche Fortress

Site information
- Type: Fort
- Owner: Portuguese Republic
- Operator: Câmara Municipal de Peniche,
- Open to the public: yes
- Condition: good

Location
- Coordinates: 39°21′15″N 9°22′47″W

Site history
- Built: 1558
- Fate: restored
- Events: Peninsular War

The Peniche Fortress is located in the municipality of Peniche in Oeste region of Portugal. Built on the site of the former Castle of Atouguia da Baleia, of which only a few vestiges remain, initial construction took place in 1557 and 1558 but there have been numerous subsequent modifications. Its defensive walls surround an area of two hectares, divided into upper and lower parts. The fortress has served a number of functions including that of a political prison during the authoritarian Estado Novo regime. It now contains a museum devoted to the resistance to the Estado Novo.

== History ==
Until the Middle Ages, Peniche was an island. However, siltation of the channel between the island and the community of Atouguia on the mainland, caused by sea currents and winds, eventually led to the sea being replaced by sand dunes, with Peniche becoming a peninsula. In the late 15th and early 16th centuries the area was the target of attacks by English, French and Barbary pirates, to which King Manuel I initially responded by installing four armed ships in Peniche. He also encouraged the idea of a permanent fortification on that part of the coast. In 1544, King John III recommended the construction of a castle on the peninsula and in the same year the most appropriate location to give protection to the town’s harbour was identified. Initial construction work was mainly carried out in 1557 and 1558 but work on the northeast and northwest walls continued until 1567. The design is believed to have been influenced by the castles built by Henry VIII of England, most notably Pendennis Castle in Falmouth.

King Sebastian I ascended the throne in 1568 and appointed D. Luís de Ataíde, 3rd Count of Atouguia, to the position of Viceroy of India (1568-1571). Work on the fortification was suspended until his return. D. Luis de Ataíde left for India for a second time in 1578, at which time the construction work was once again suspended. During the Spanish rule of Portugal (1581-1640), Philip II of Spain sent a military engineer to Peniche in 1589 to consolidate the fort and its walls and study possible improvements. In the same year British troops, under the command of Francis Drake, began a march on Lisbon at Peniche, in an unsuccessful attempt to restore Portuguese sovereignty.

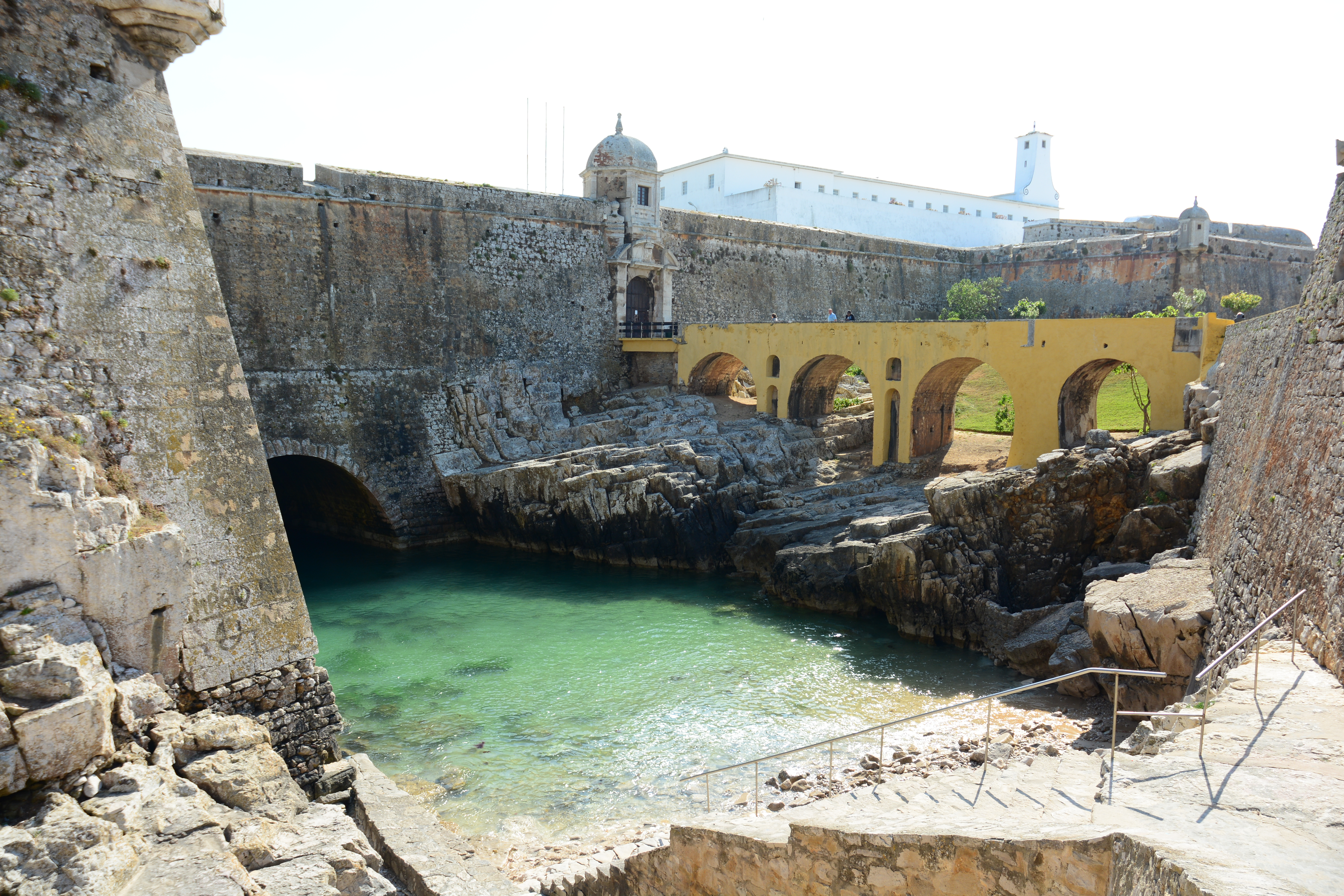
Interior view of the fortress

In 1625 Philip IV of Spain highlighted the urgency of building a fort on the Berlengas islands, ten kilometres off the coast of Peniche, as these were often visited by corsairs. He also suggested opening a channel on the isthmus between Peniche and the mainland, thus returning Peniche to being an easily defendable island. However, while the Berlengas fort was eventually constructed, Peniche remained connected to the mainland. At the time of the Portuguese Restoration War (1640-1668) it was considered necessary to further improve the Peniche fortress’s defences and in 1642 an engineer was sent to Peniche for this purpose. He prepared new plans, noting that soldiers were complaining about the lack of accommodation, food, garrisons and artillery. This led to considerable expansion, resulting in an irregular star-shaped fort, which was completed in 1645. King John IV visited Peniche to inspect the fortress in 1652.

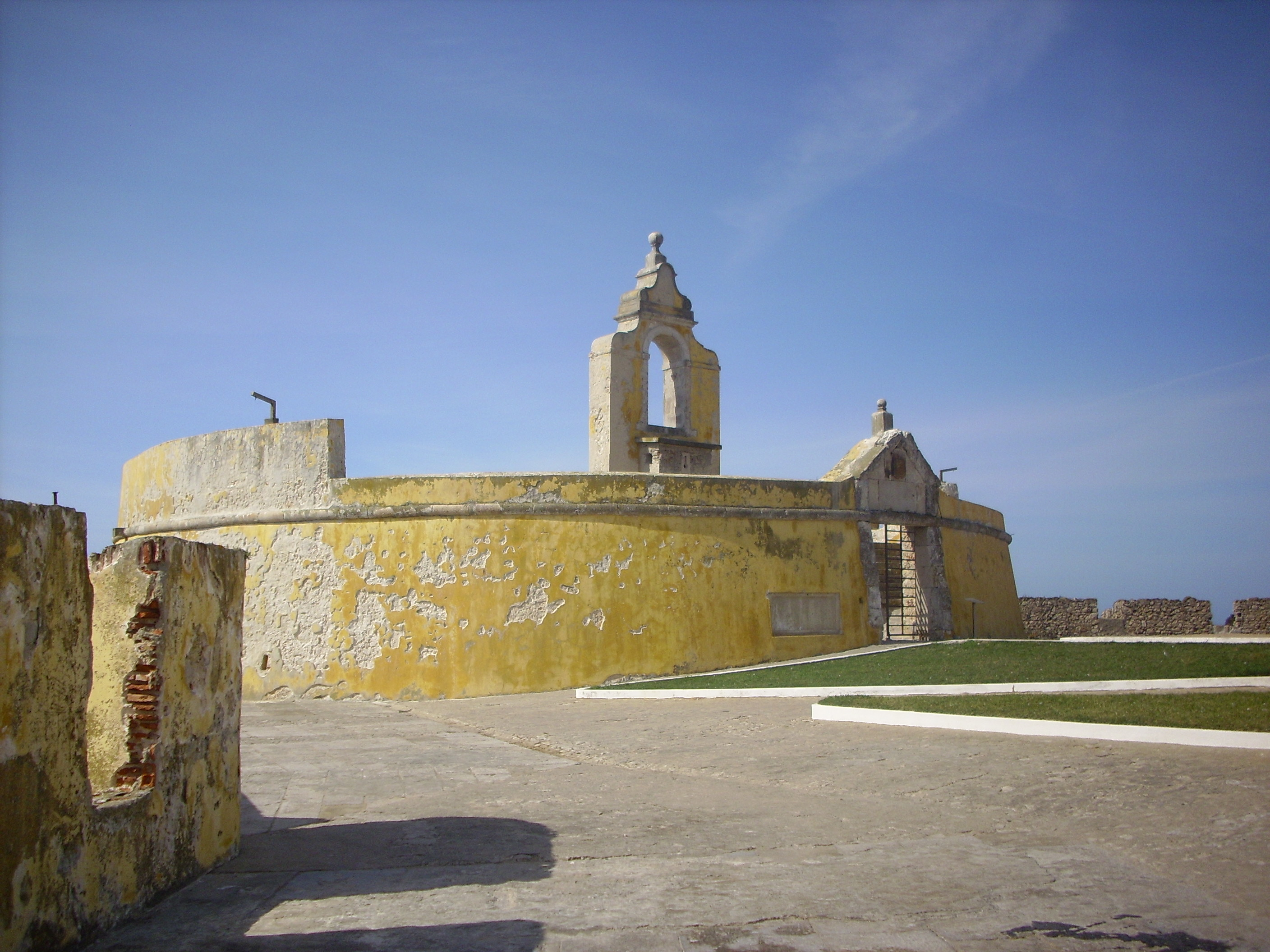
Entrance to the upper part of the fortress

The major earthquake in 1755 that affected much of Portugal destroyed part of the fortress, which was subsequently repaired. In 1773 work was carried out on remodelling the chapel of Santa Bárbara inside the fortress. Shortly afterwards an inspection report was prepared that commented negatively on its condition and in 1800 new batteries were built to make landing in the harbour more difficult and the parapet of the fortress facing the sea was also raised in height. The extent of the work carried out caused financial problems for the local people, who sought and obtained assistance from Queen Maria I. Further extensive improvements were carried out in 1807. However, the fortress proved to be ineffective in December 1807 during the Peninsular War, when Franco-Spanish troops landed at Peniche. Following their defeat by Anglo-Portuguese troops it was briefly considered in 1810 as a possible embarkation point for British troops should the renewed French invasion make this necessary. After the Congress of Vienna in 1815, which established peace within Europe, the fortress was abandoned. With urban pressure resulting from the population growth of Peniche, certain parts were dismantled. In 1824 it was temporarily converted to a prison and used to detain political prisoners. During the Portuguese Civil War (1828-1834) it was reoccupied but when Liberal forces occupied the Berlengas Fort in 1833, Absolutist forces left Peniche. In 1837 an explosion of gunpowder inside the fortress led to a violent fire, which completely destroyed the Governor's House. In 1871, the Governor of the fortress reported on its bad condition and some restoration work was carried out.

=== Recent history ===
During the Second Boer War (1899-1902), the fortress’s buildings were used to accommodate Boers who had sought refuge from the British in the Portuguese colony of Mozambique. During World War I (1914-1918), German and Austrian nationals were detained there. From 1928 the buildings were used as a tuberculosis sanatorium. However, in 1934, under the Estado Novo, or Second Republic, it was converted into a maximum-security political prison. In 1938 all buildings of the fortress were classified as a national monument, leading to some repair work being undertaken in subsequent years, in some cases making use of prisoners as labour.

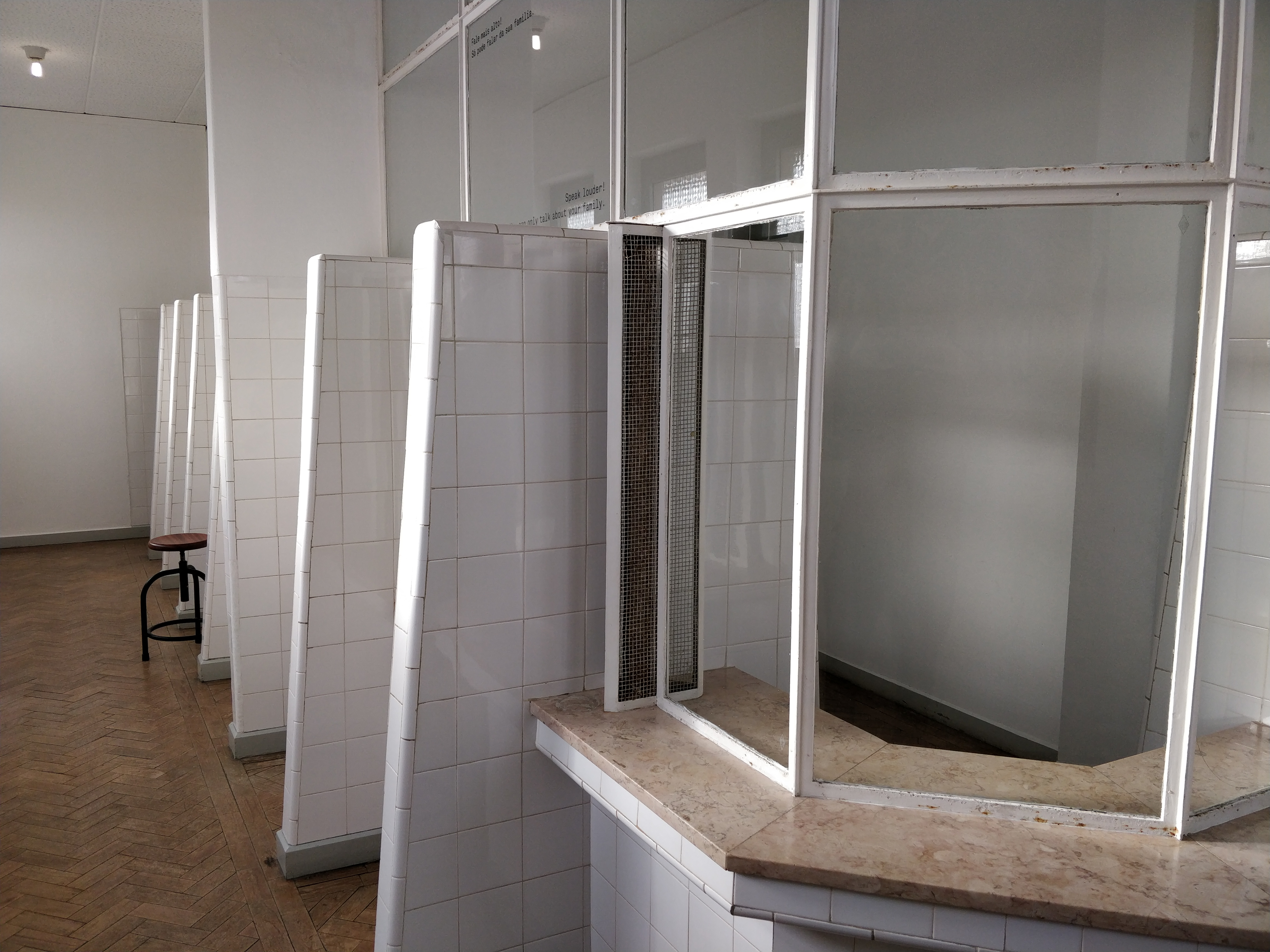
The visiting room for prisoners

The fortress became famous for two escapes by prisoners opposed to the authoritarian government. In December 1954, a Communist supporter, António Dias Lourenço, managed to squeeze through a 20 cm x 40 cm opening that he sawed in his cell door. He then attempted to descend 20 meters to the sea with a rope made with sheets torn into strips. However, the improvised rope broke, causing him to fall into the sea. Although being dragged by the waves he managed to reach land and escape with assistance from fishermen. On January 3, 1960, communist leaders Álvaro Cunhal, Francisco Martins Rodrigues and eight others connived with a member of the National Republican Guard who agreed to immobilize with chloroform a colleague responsible for the surveillance of the prisoners. They also descended the walls with a rope made of sheets. This escape became a great embarrassment for the government, which claimed that a Soviet submarine had been near the Peniche coast waiting to pick up the escapees. During the Carnation Revolution on April 25, 1974, which led to the overthrow of the Estado Novo, the fortress was one of the main targets of the initial coup.

From 1977 to the early 1980s, in the context of the process of Portuguese decolonization in Africa, parts of the fortress were used as temporary accommodation for families returning from the overseas territories. After departure of the last returnees from the former colonies, a group of Peniche citizens, with the agreement of the City Council, developed a museum in the fortress dedicated to the anti-fascist resistance. Improvements in 1984 made it possible to visit the cell where the secretary general of the Portuguese Communist Party, Álvaro Cunhal, had been held, as well as the location of his escape. Further repairs and improvements to the fortress were made in the 1990s. Plans in 2008 to use part of the fortress as a hotel (as has been done, for example, in the Citadel of Cascais) did not materialize. Further repairs to the fortress were made between 2010 and 2013 but it remained in an advanced state of degradation. In 2016 it was included on a list of national monuments to be granted to private bodies under a programme (REVIVE) designed to promote private investment for tourism purposes but was withdrawn after two months following popular opposition to the idea. In November 2017 it was closed to visitors to permit further work to be carried out.

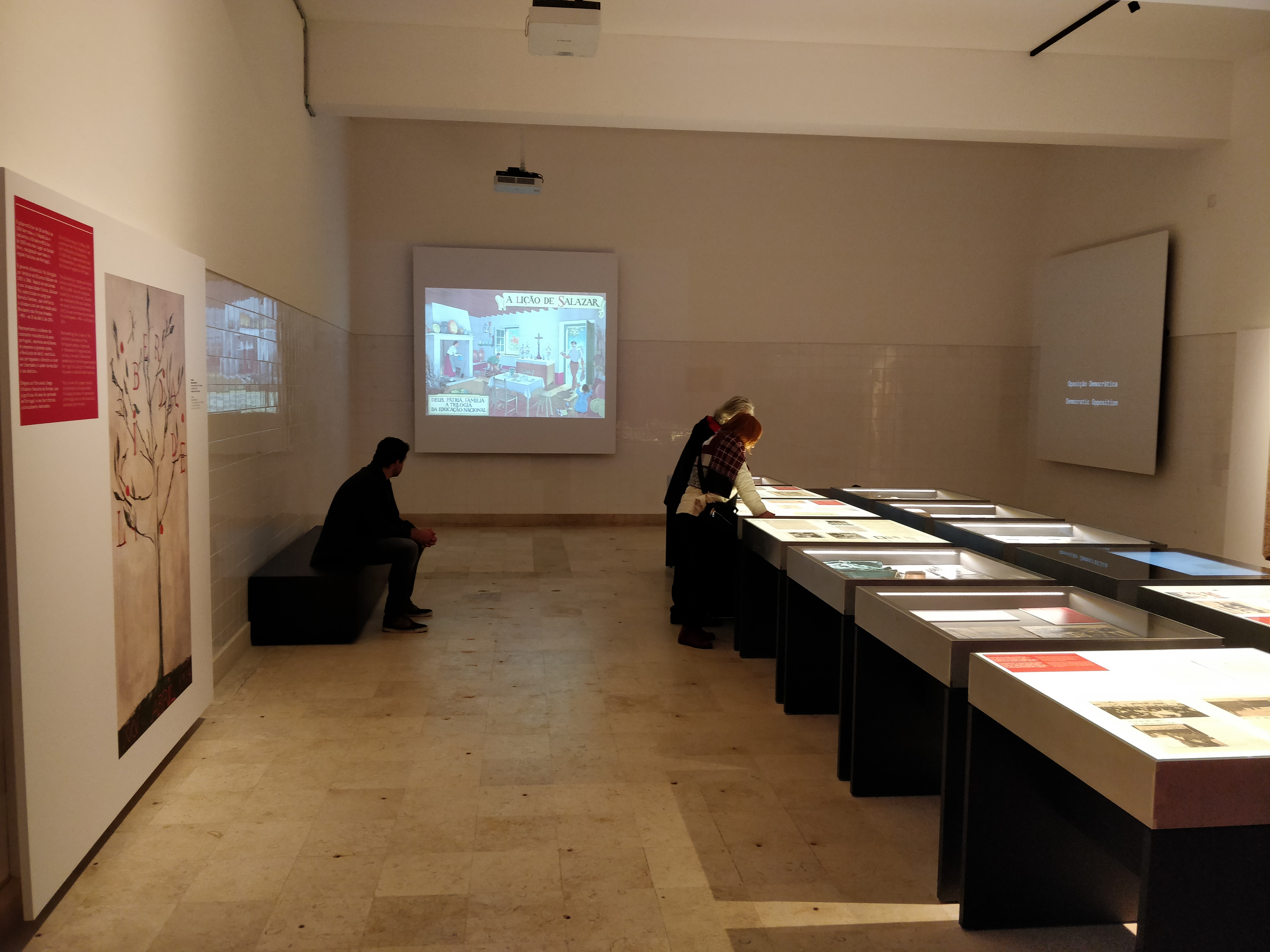
Part of the exhibition at the Fortress

A sum of €3.5mn was allocated in April 2017 in the Portuguese budget for repairs and preparation of museum spaces and a tender for the design was completed in early 2018. On 2 May 2019 an exhibition at the Fortress was opened by the Portuguese Prime Minister António Costa, designed to give an indication of the types of exhibits that will be available when the museum, to be known as the National Museum of Resistance and Freedom (Museu Nacional da Resistência e da Liberdade), was completed. It was formally opened on 27 April 2024, two days after the 50th anniversary of the Carnation Revolution.

== Prisoners held in the fortress ==
- José Inácio Candido de Loyola
- António Borges Coelho
- Domingos Abrantes
- Tristão de Bragança Cunha
- Álvaro Cunhal
- Octávio Pato
- Francisco Martins Rodrigues
- Pedro dos Santos Soares

== See also ==
- Fort of São João Baptista (Berlengas)
- Fort of Consolation Beach
