= Fort Nossa Senhora da Consolação =

17th Century fort in Portugal

- Forte de Nossa Senhora da Consolação.
- Leiria District; Near Peniche in Portugal
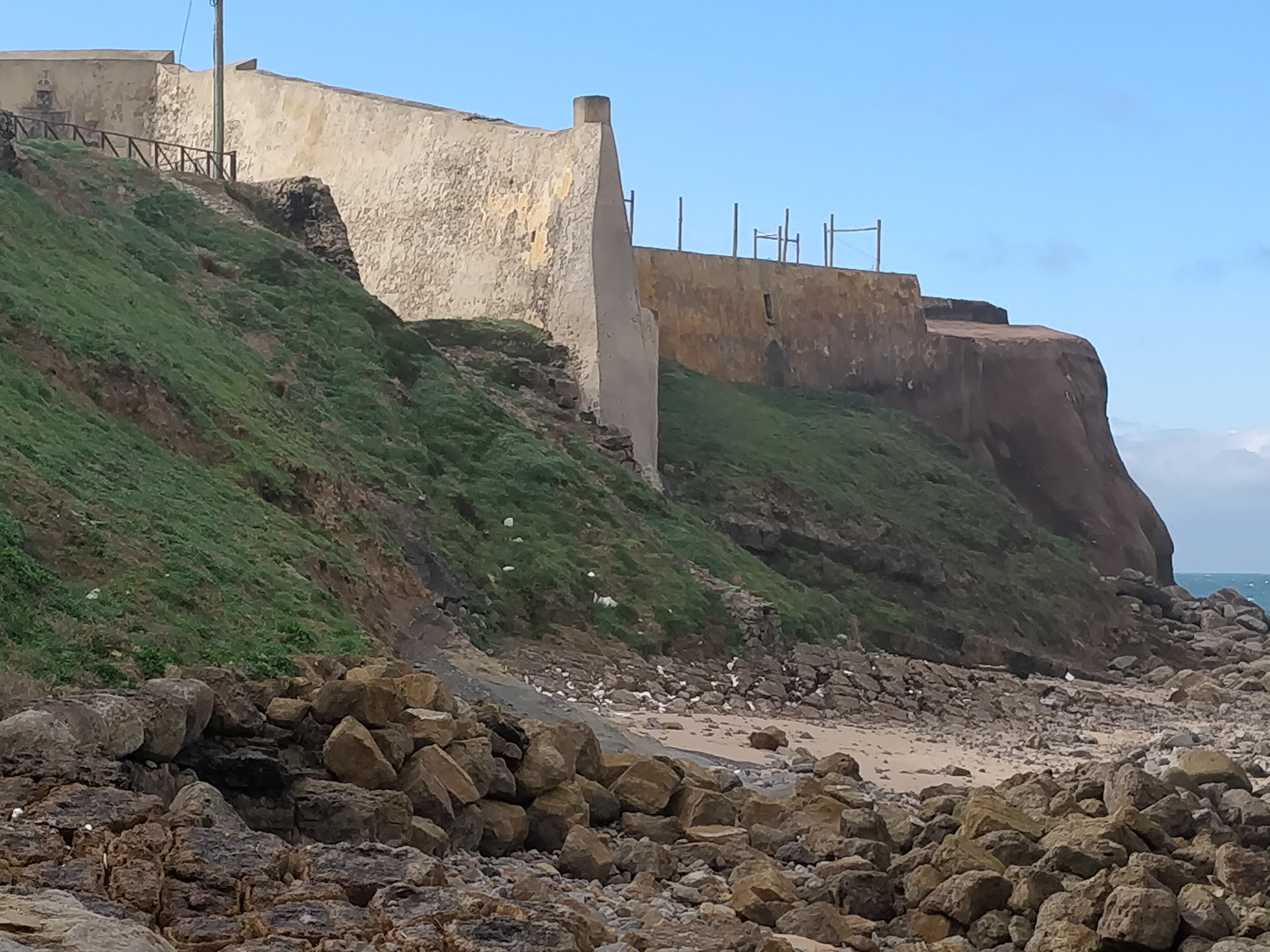
- View of the fort from Consolação beach

Site information
- Type: Bastion fort
- Open to the public: no
- Condition: Good, but subject to coastal erosion

Location
- Coordinates: 39°19′29″N 9°21′36″W

Site history
- Built: 1645
- Built by: D. Jerónimo de Ataíde, 6th Count of Atouguia
- In use: until 1834-5
- Fate: Plans for conversion to a museum (2017)

The Fort Nossa Senhora da Consolação (Portuguese: Forte de Nossa Senhora da Consolação), also known as Fort of Consolação Beach (Portuguese: Forte da Praia da Consolação) is located on the Atlantic coast of Portugal in the parish of Atouguia da Baleia, in the municipality of Peniche in Leiria District. It was built in 1645 during the Portuguese Restoration War on the initiative of D. Jerónimo de Ataíde, 6th Count of Atouguia and Lord of Peniche.

== History ==
The Fort of Consolation Beach was built at the southern end of the beach on which, during the Spanish rule of Portugal between 1581 and 1640, a force of 6500 British soldiers under the command of Robert Devereux, 2nd Earl of Essex had landed on May 26, 1589, in order to join a military expedition under the command of Francis Drake and John Norris, who had orders from Elizabeth I of England to restore Portuguese sovereignty.

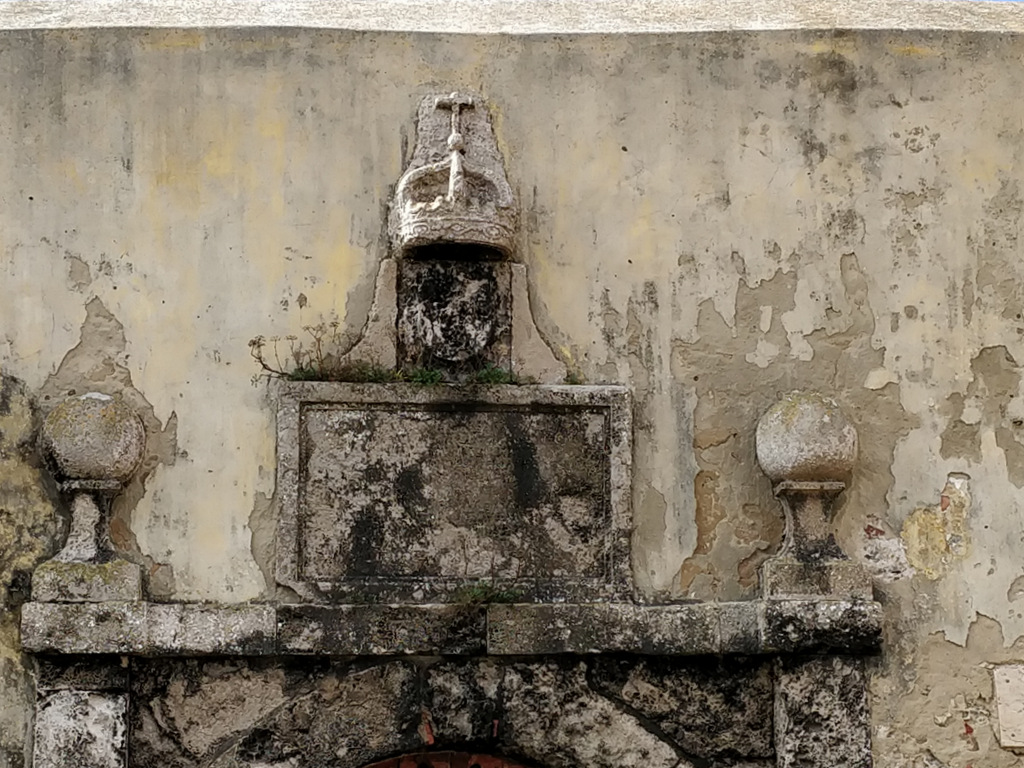
Close-up of the Entrance Portal

The fort, which is in a dominant position on a rocky escarpment, is star-shaped, with four triangular bastions and five platforms for the artillery. Following a Late Renaissance architectural style, it is protected by a moat to the east, with access by a bridge. The main portal contained a crowned national coat of arms and a plaque recording the fort's establishment. It was built to reinforce the defense of the south of Peniche, crossing fire with the Fortress of Peniche. Its construction was part of a strategy for the entire coastline of Portugal that aimed at enhancing the defence offered by a limited number of fortresses with the addition of a succession of small forts. Construction began in 1641 and was finished in 1645. Further expansion was carried out in 1665. The fort was seriously damaged by the earthquake in 1755 that affected most parts of Portugal, with part of the battery facing the sea being destroyed. In 1796 five gun emplacements were added and in 1800 a new battery with 15 cannon was erected to the east of the fort to both cover the beach and cut off access from the land. Restoration work was also carried out in 1832 during the Portuguese Civil War.

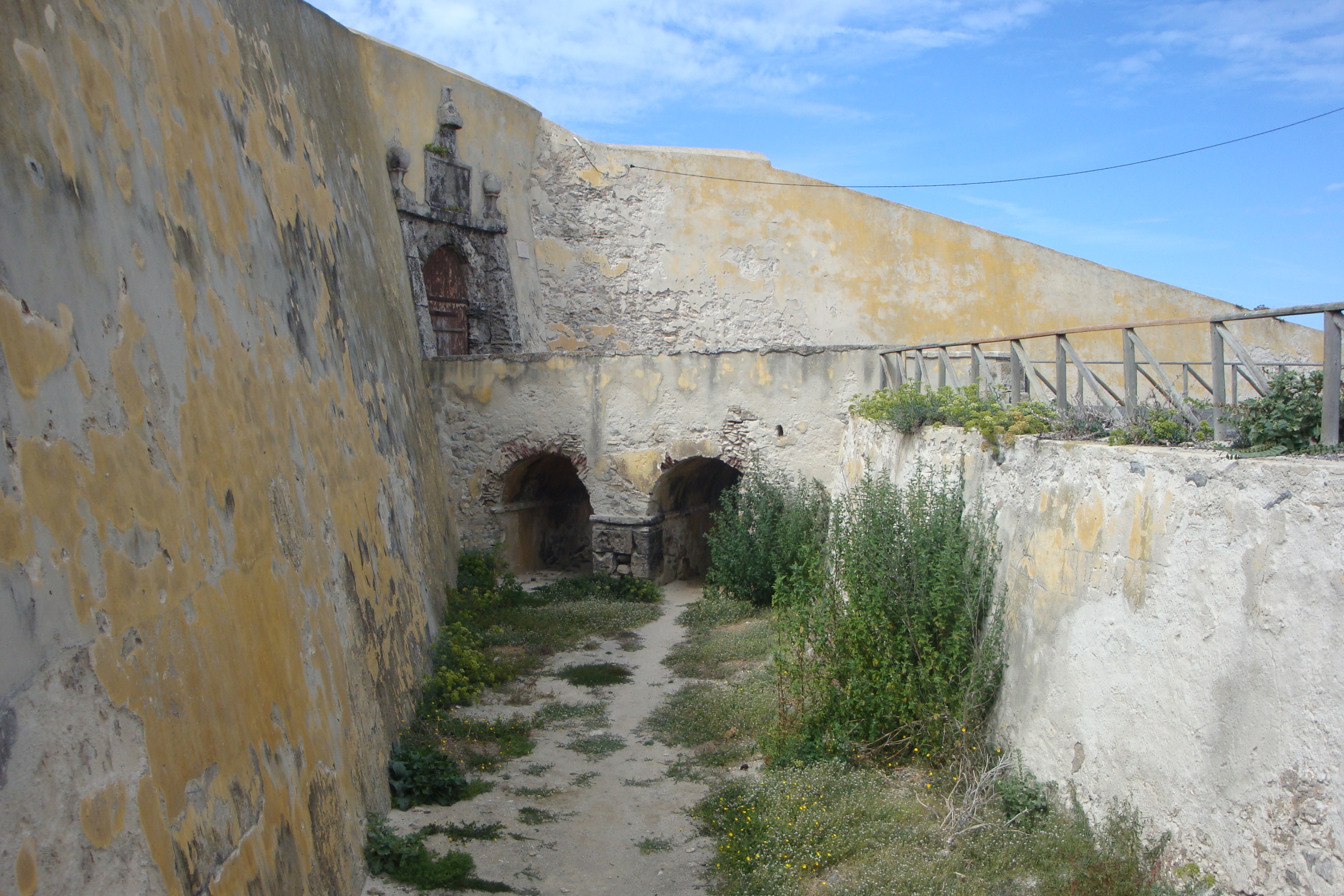
The moat

From 1947 the fort was ceded to a religious order as holiday accommodation, being adapted in 1954 for these purposes. Further work on the interior was carried out in 1983. The wall, moat, and bridge panels were subject to restoration in 1997. In 2003, the sections of the wall adjacent to the stairs to the beach were stabilized. However, the cliffs on which the fort is built are in an advanced state of erosion, continuing to jeopardize its stability. The fort was classified as a National Monument in 1978. In 2017 it was ceded by the Portuguese State to the Peniche City Council with the intention of establishing two museums, one on the area's geology and the other on its military history.
