= Battle of the Berlengas (1666) =

Battle during the Portuguese Restoration War

Coordinates: 39.42°N 9.50°W

- Part of the Portuguese Restoration War
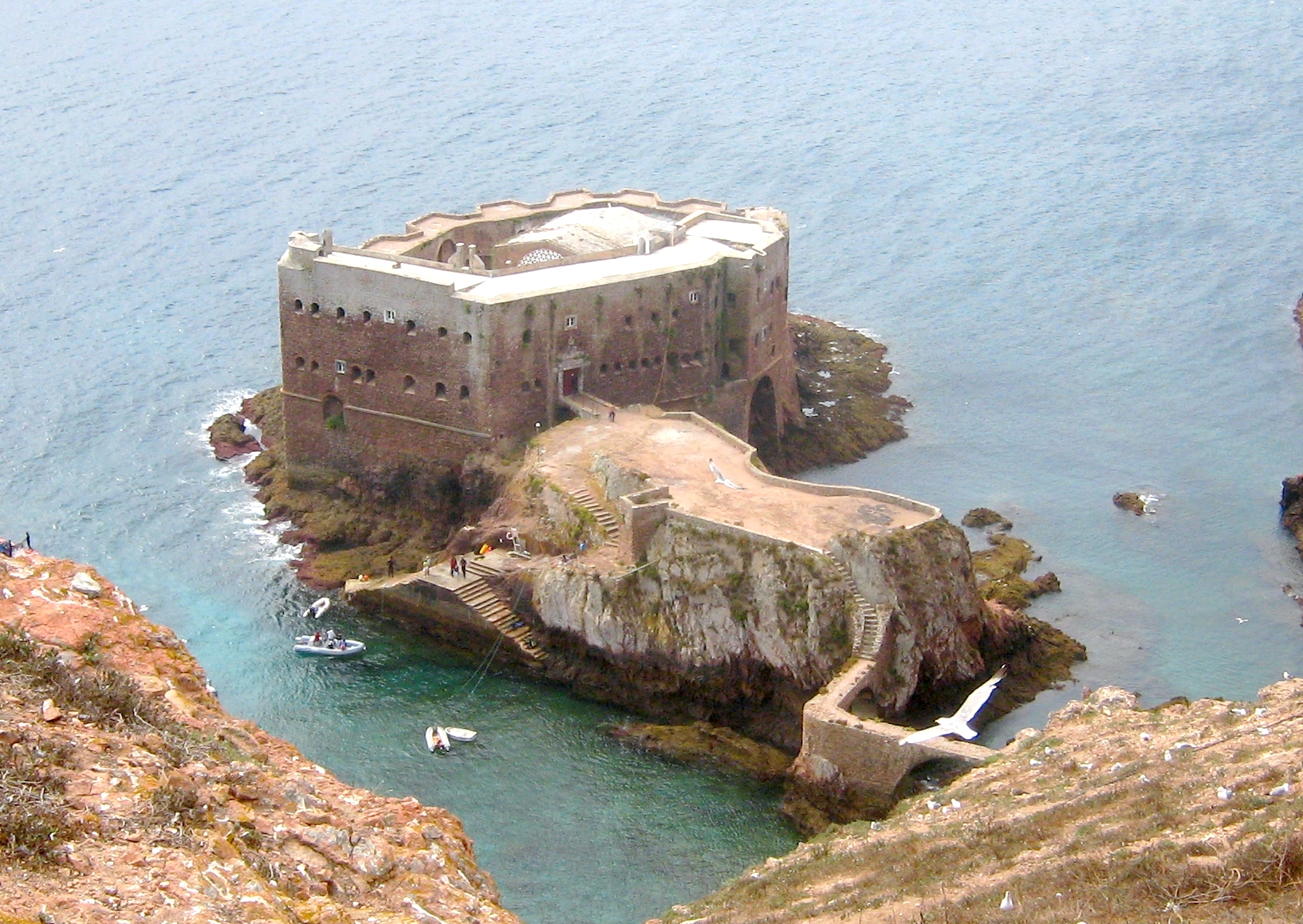
- Fort of São João Baptista
Date	28 June to 1 July 1666
Location	Berlengas, Portugal
Result	Spanish victory

Belligerents
Spain	Portugal

Commanders and leaders
Diego Ibarra	António Pessoa

Strength
1,500; 15 warships	28

Casualties and losses
41 killed and wounded	5 killed and wounded 23 captured

The Battle of Berlengas was fought in 1666 during the Portuguese Restoration War, between the Portuguese defenders of the Fort São João Baptista and a Spanish fleet commanded by Diego de Ibarra. The fleet, which had destroyed Portuguese fisheries, bombarded towns and cut off supplies in one month as part of its onslaught, proceeded to storm the fort on the Berlengas. The fort was destroyed and the entire garrison were captured.

After the attack the repair of the fort was initiated, being concluded in 1678 by João de Mascarenhas, 1st Marquess of Fronteira.
