= Castle of Atouguia da Baleia =

Medieval castle in Atouguia da Baleia, Peniche, Portugal

- Castelo da Atouguia da Baleia
- Centro of Portugal
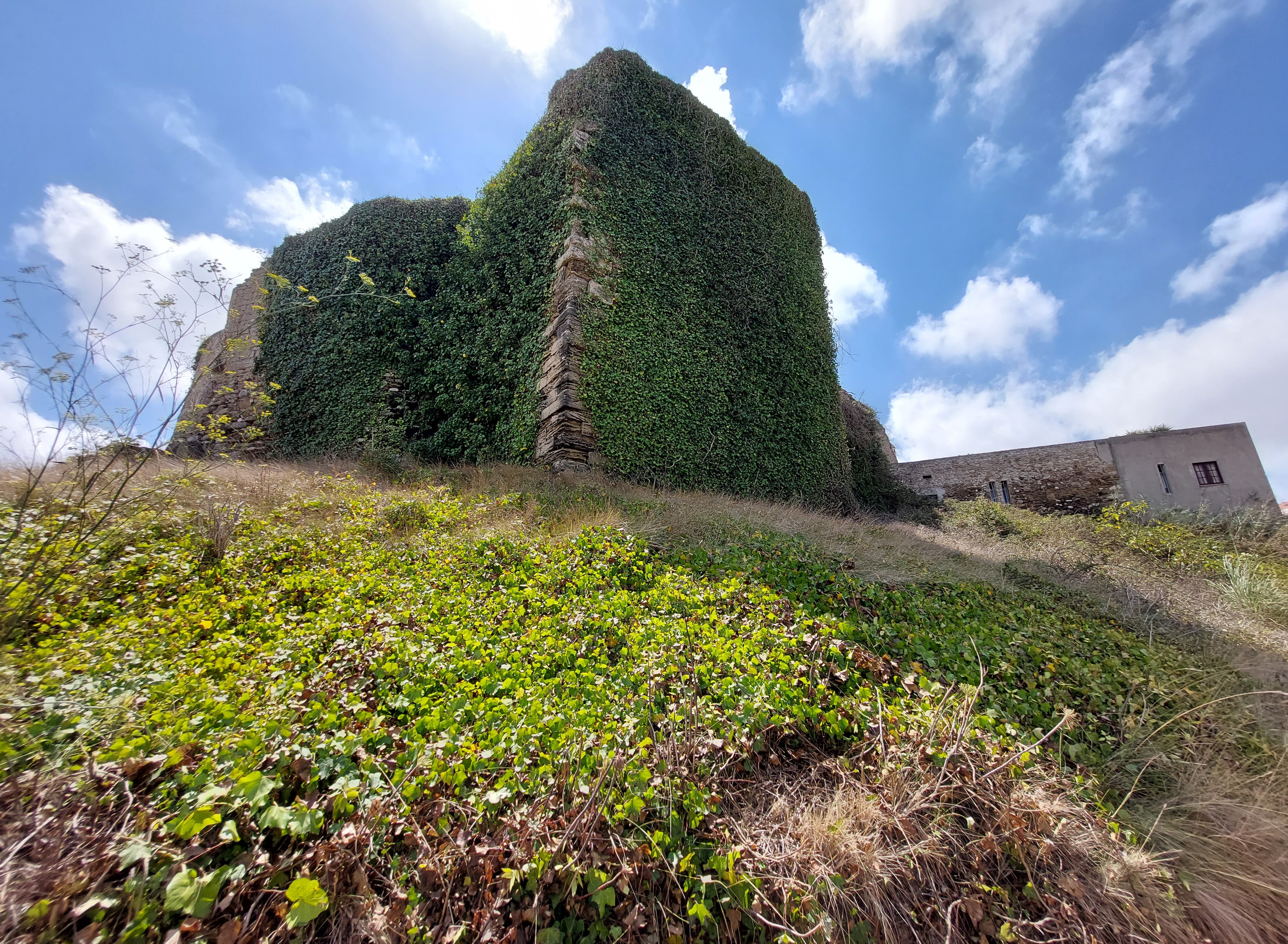
- Tower and wall of the old Castle of Atouguia da Baleia

Site information
- Type: Castle
- Owner: Portuguese Republic
- Open to the public: Public

Location
- Coordinates: 39°20′24″N 9°19′31″W

Site history
- Built: 800 A.D.
- Materials: Masonry

The Castle of Atouguia da Baleia (Portuguese: Castelo da Atouguia da Baleia) is a medieval castle in the civil parish of Atouguia da Baleia, municipality of Peniche, and in the Oeste region of the historical Estremadura province.

== History ==
The site was, in 800 A.D., a convent of São Julião; from an inscription in the interior chapel, it was counsel Decio Junio Bruto who consecrated the Roman temple, to Neptune, for his victory against the peoples of d'Eburóbriga.

The document of donation to the herdade da Touguia date to 1158, when the territory confronting Óbidos and Lourinhã, passed into the possessions of D. Gulherme de Cornibus, a shield knight of Afonso Henriques, for his conquests in 1147. In 1165, the colony was settled by Wilhelmo Lacorne (or Cornes), a French noble who D. Afonso I donated the town, for his efforts in taking Lisbon. As a result, on 1167, a foral (charter) was issued by D. Afonso.

From that donation and subsequent settlement efforts, as well as organization of the territory, that the castle was built. In 1187, at the time of a new foral, Antougia was mentioned as having a military structure, and alluded to the need for further defensive structures that integrated watchtowers. During the reign of King D. Sancho I, on 1191, following the death of all the friars in the convent from the Black Death, the possessions of São Julião were incorporated into the Alcobaça Monastery.

In 1218, the foral was confirmed by D. Afonso II in Santarém. It is unclear whether the fortress was refurbished at this time. During the 14th century, King D. Dinis initiated public works on the castle after donating the town to his alcalde, Queen D. Isabel. Between 1373 (or 1376) the Cortes are celebrated in the reign of King D. Ferdinand. A law to regulate the jurisdiction of Donataries, that provided various privileges, including navigation and commerce in the kingdom was passed in 1376.

In 1510, a new foral was issued from Santárem for Atouguia by King D. Manuel of Portugal. Until 1526, the region was known at Touguia, Tauguia or Touria (named for the bulls that roamed in Crown lands), but adopted its formal title "Atouguia da Baleia" following the beaching of a 20 metres (66 ft) whale in the beach of Areia Branca.

The lands of Antougia passed from the Crown of Portugal in 1759 to the donataries of the Counts of Atouguia. But, King Joseph I extinguished the countship of Antougia that year following the attempted regicide.

The process to classify the castle was organized in 1950, but it was not until 23 May 2003, that the structure was classified as an Imóvel de Interesse Público (Property of Public Interest) by the Ministry of Culture.

== Architecture ==
The castle is situated by urban landscape, integrated into a private property. Addorsed to the walls of the castle is the Casa do Castelo (House of the Castle, constructed in the 17th century and expanded in the 19th century to act as rural tourism lodging. Nearby is the Church of São Leonardo, the parochial church of Atouguia da Baleia, a Romanesque-Gothic church classified as a national monument.

From the fortifications, only the walled courtyard with keep tower remains situated on level ground occupying an oval plan. The former merlons are non-existent.
