= Fort of São João Baptista (Berlengas) =

Fort in Peniche, Leiria District, Portugal

Fort Saint John the Baptist
- Forte de São João Baptista
- Leiria, Oeste, Centro in Portugal
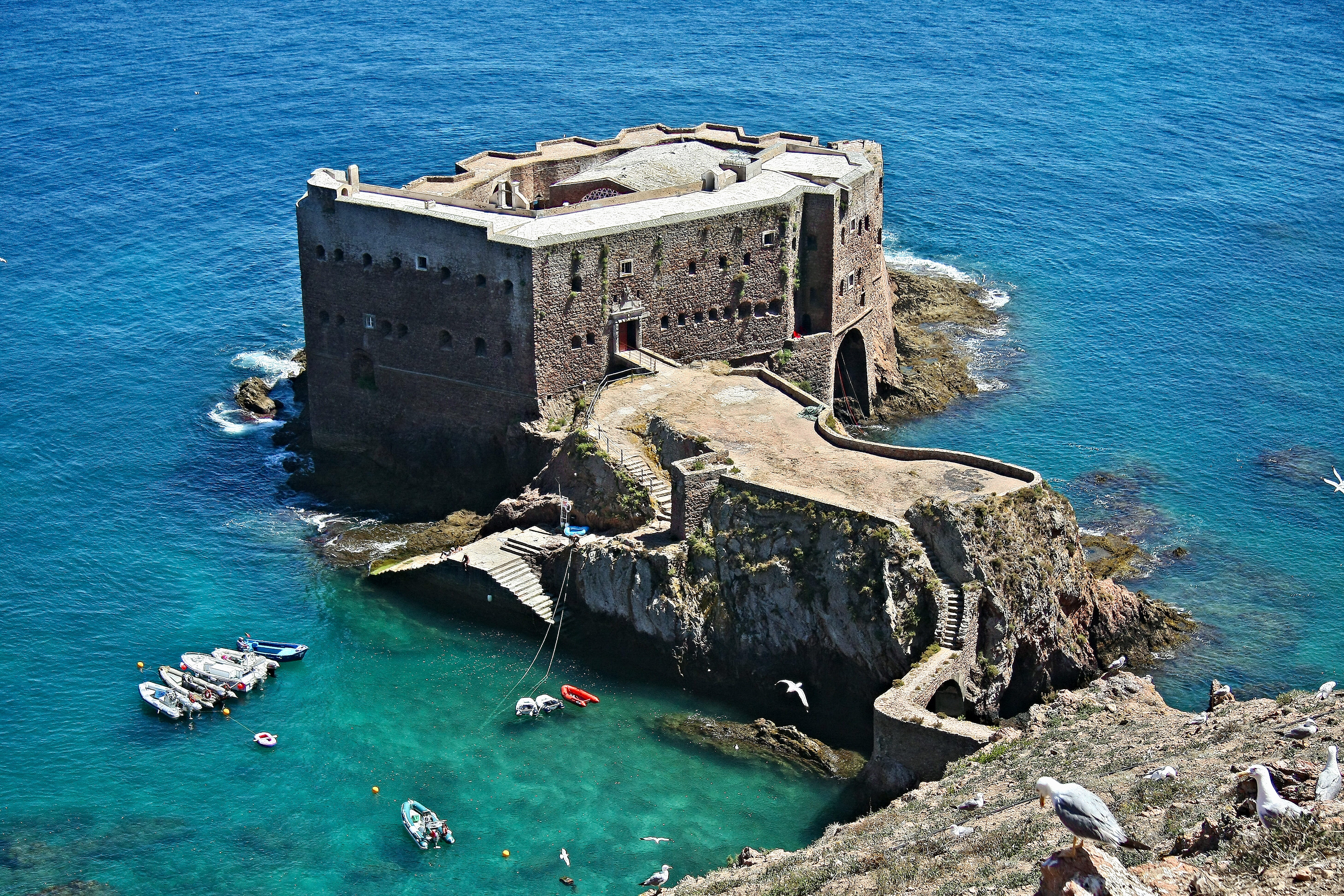

Site information
- Type: Fort
- Owner: Portuguese Republic
- Operator: Câmara Municipal de Peniche, Associação dos Amigos da Berlenga
- Open to the public: Private

Location
- Coordinates: 39°24′40.46″N 9°30′36.42″W

Site history
- Built: c. 1502
- Materials: Masonry, Pink granite, Pavement, Wood, Glass, Concrete

The Fort of São João Baptista das Berlengas, or simply known as the Fort of the Berlengas, is located off western coast of Portugal, on the largest island of the archipelago of the Berlengas, in the municipality of Peniche in Oeste region. The fortification belonged to a group of defensive military structures meant to protect the municipality located on the coast.

== History ==
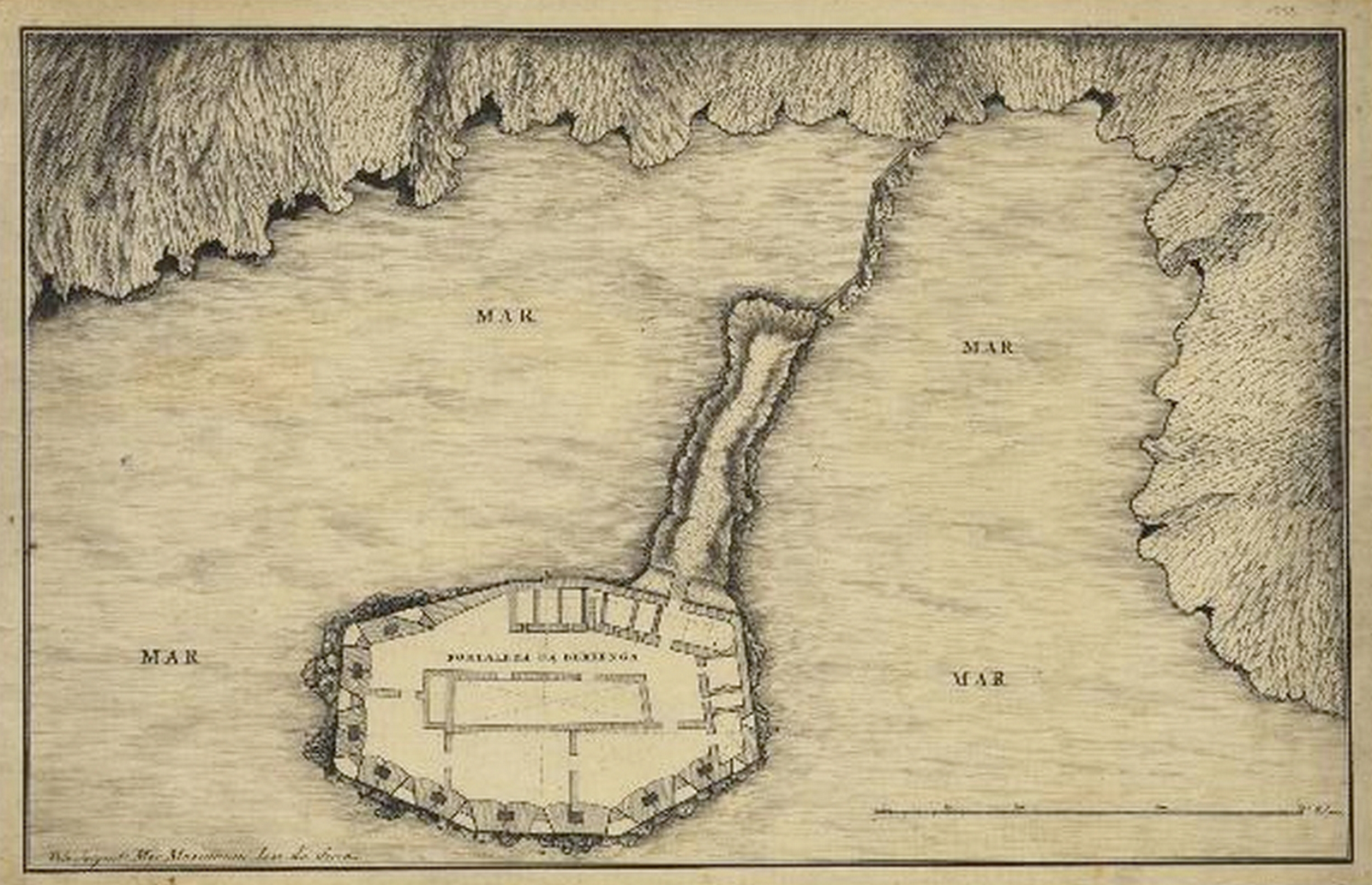
19th century plan of the Forte of the Berlengas

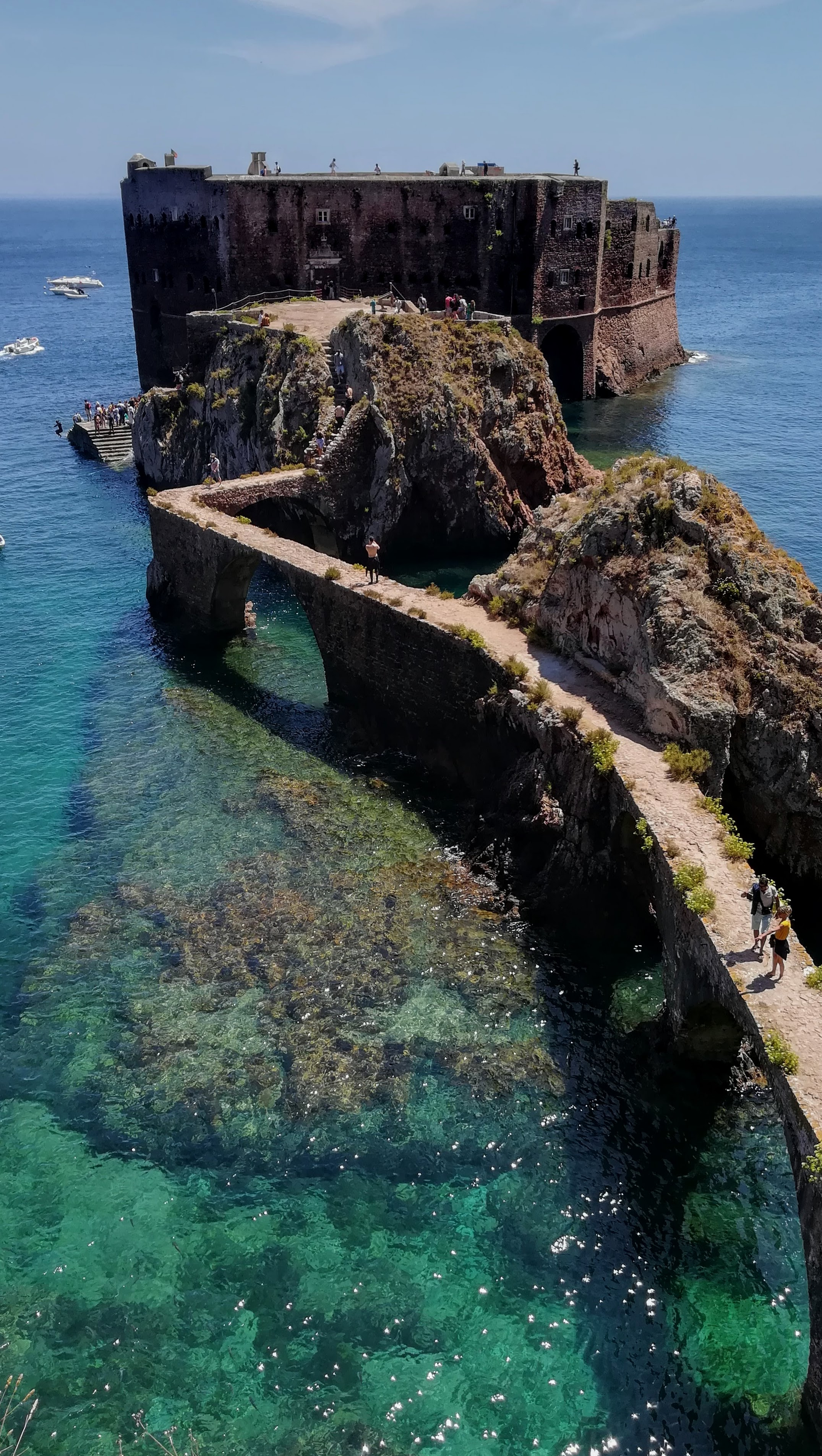
View of the north and western facades of the Fort, showing the arched bridge that provides access to the grounds

King Manuel of Portugal ordered the construction of a fortress on Berlenga Grande in 1502, which was immediately rectified under the reign of King Sebastian of Portugal. The fort was constructed from the remains of a pre-existing monastery (the Monastery of the Misericórdia da Berlenga), which had previously been abandoned. Hieronymite monks had, in the early 16th century, decided that the Berlengas were well situated to provide aid for seafearing people in need of shelter. The islands isolation also provided ideal conditions for the monks to live in austerity through solitude and silence, assiduous prayer and healthy penance. But, the monks became victims of frequent attacks by Algerian, Moroccan, English, and French pirates and privateers. Further, violent weather often cut-off communication to the mainland, which was especially distressing during pirate incursions, as result, the Monastery was abandoned.

It was only during the middle of 17th century that construction began, under the administration of John IV of Portugal, after the visit of João Rodrigues de Sá to the island, who, accompanied by a military engineer determined the plan to follow in its construction (in 1651). Originally during the Portuguese Restoration War, the Counsel of War had determined that a better coastal defense was needed, and had ordered the demolition of the monastery ruins to build the fort. By 1666 construction of the fort had proceed under the direction of engineer Mateus do Couto. That year the Fort of the Berlenga was instrumental in stopping the attack by a Spanish fleet, which was sent to kidnap Queen Maria Francisca of Savoy, on her arrival in Portugal, when she was to be married to King Afonso VI of Portugal. After this attack, the King ordered the repair of the fortress, increasing the firepower of its defenses. Following its destruction by Spanish corsairs in 1666, it was finally completed in 1678 under the command of General Marquês da Fronteira (from an inscription over a gate).

During the French invasion of the peninsula, the outpost served as a base for British troops, although it was the French later who plundered it. In 1821, João VI of Portugal ordered a remodelling of the fort that included the reconstruction of the chapel, which had been burned down during the French assault. The fort was also used during the Liberal Wars, serving as a forward base for troops loyal to Pedro IV of Portugal, to attack the fortress of Peniche (then occupied by Miguelist forces). Fourteen years later its armaments were removed, beginning a gradual decline in the fort's state.

In 1953, the fort was repaired and remodelled as part of an attempt to adapt the structure into an inn (Portuguese: pousada).

The DGEMN Direcção-Geral dos Edifícios e Monumentos Nacionais (Directorate-General of Buildings and National Monuments) became involved after 1981 in the restoration of the structure, culminating in projects between 1986 and 1987 to consolidate the fortification and make it secure for visitors. The fortress is open to the public during the summer, with guides reserved through the Casa Abrigo.

== Architecture ==
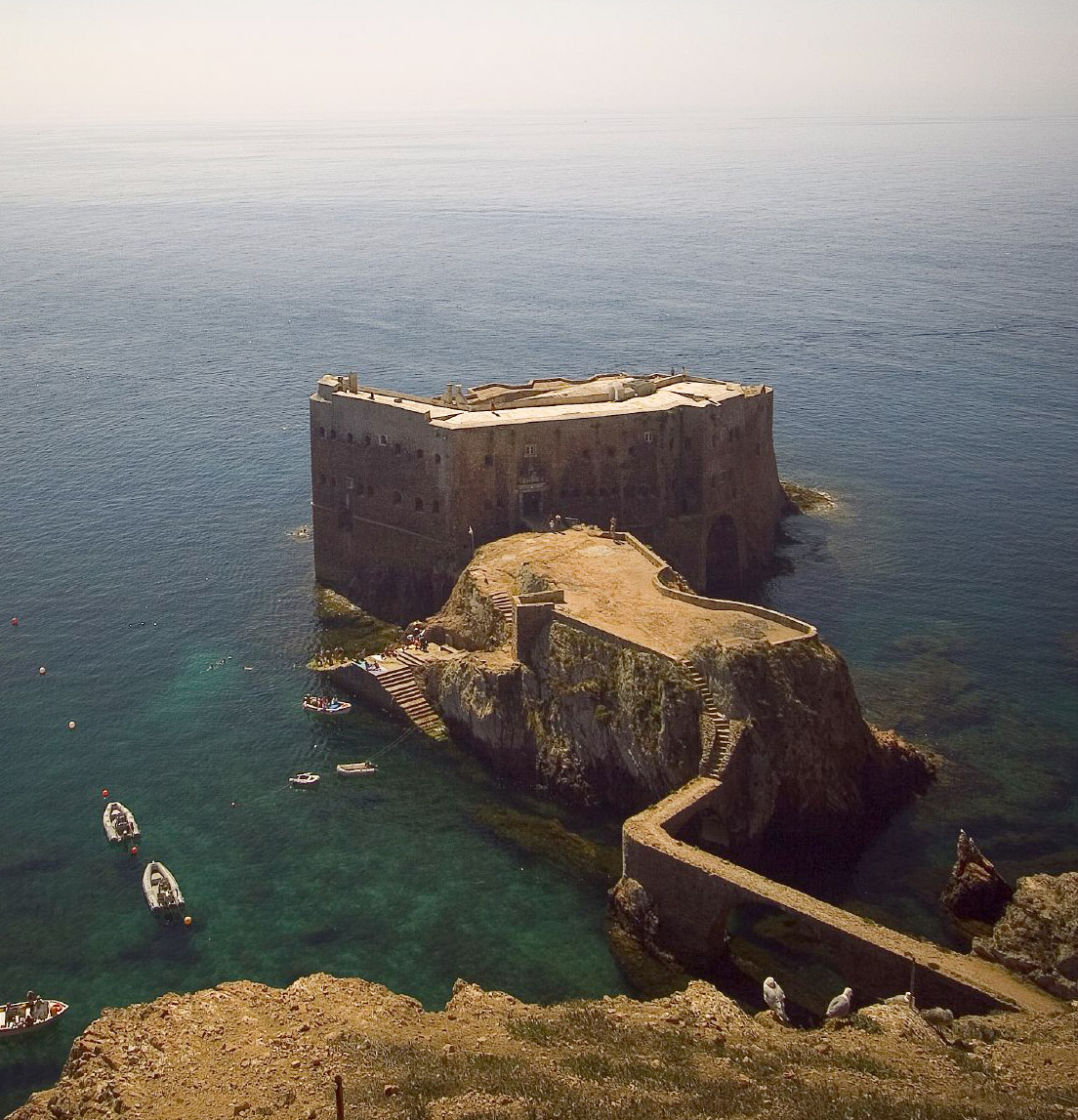
A view of the Fort, with the cove and anchorage providing access to the island

The fort is located in the waters off the southeastern coast of Berlenga Grande, on a small islet connected to the island by a causeway/arch-bridge and anchorage to the north.

The structure is irregular octagon, longer from north to south, with a similarly irregular rectangular structure on this base covered in paved terraces, with a slight incline. The two-storey walls serve as both defense and narrow enclosed corridors that circuit its perimeter, broken by several arched windows on the northern and western facades. Meanwhile, the southern and eastern facades are broken by an irregular curtain of canon embrasures.

The structures on the exterior wall functioned as the casemates, while the central body functioned as the armory.
