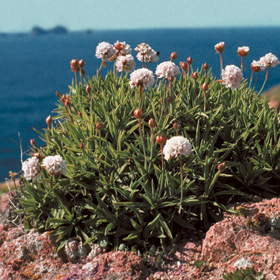

Conservation status
- Critically Endangered (IUCN 3.1)

Scientific classification
- Kingdom: Plantae
- Clade: Embryophytes
- Clade: Tracheophytes
- Clade: Spermatophytes
- Clade: Angiosperms
- Clade: Eudicots
- Order: Caryophyllales
- Family: Plumbaginaceae
- Genus: Armeria
- Species: A. berlengensis

Binomial name
- Armeria berlengensis Daveau

= Armeria berlengensis =

Species of flowering plant

Armeria berlengensis is a flowering plant in the family Plumbaginaceae. It is endemic to the Berlengas, a Portuguese archipelago, where it occurs on the rocky granitic slopes of the islands. It is common on both Berlenga Grande Island and Farilhões Islets.

It is a shrub about 40 cm (16 in) in diameter, which flowers in April and May. The flowers are small, pale pink, and grouped into inflorescences at the end of long pedicels.

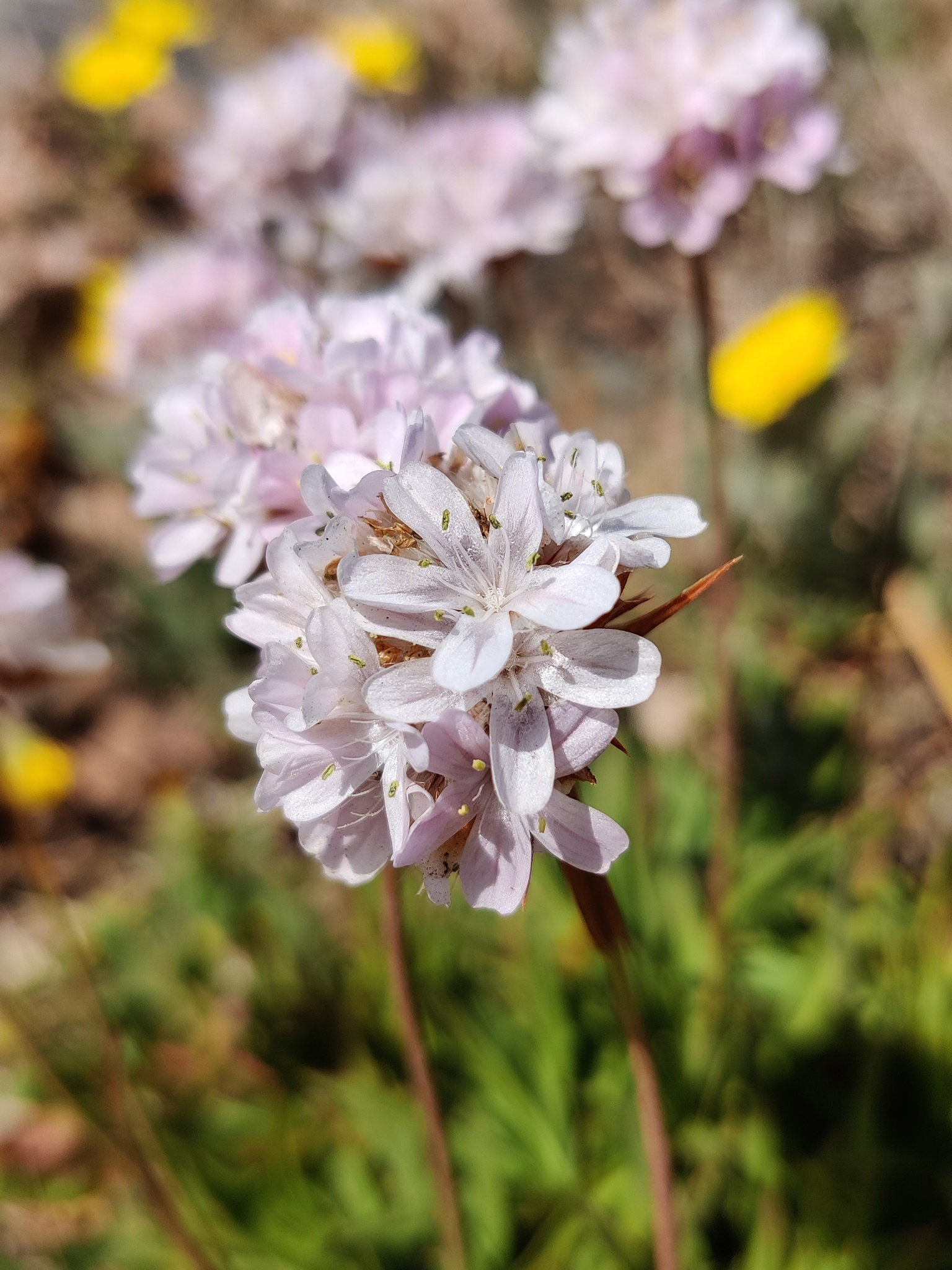
Close-up of inflorescence
