= Berlengas Natural Reserve =

Protected area in Portugal

- IUCN category IV (habitat/species management area)
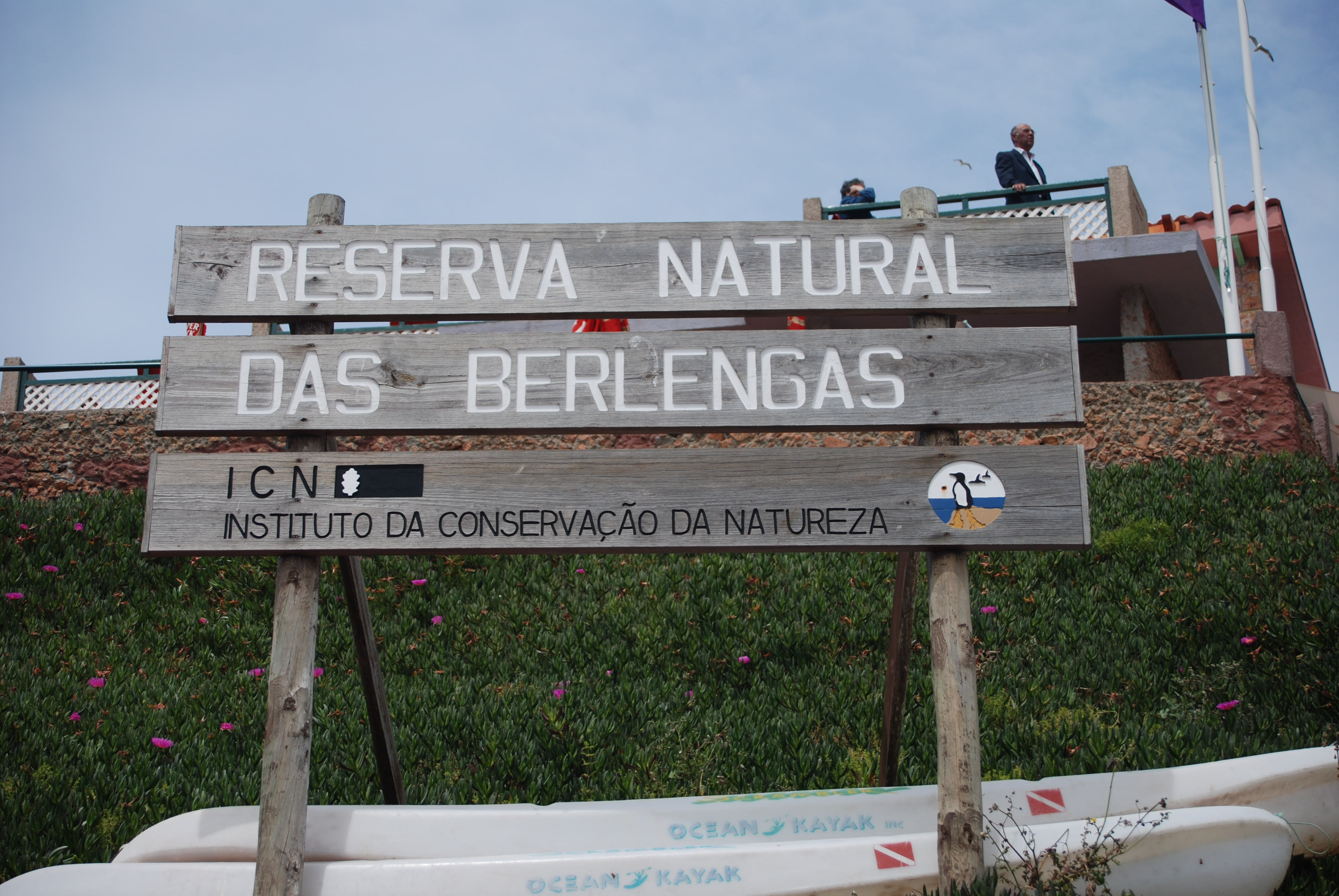
- Nature Reserve Welcome Sign
- Interactive map of Berlengas Natural Reserve
- Location: Berlengas, Portugal
- Coordinates: 39°27′20″N 9°31′03″W
- Area: 95.6 km^{2} (36.9 sq mi)
- Established: 1981
- Governing body: ICNF

Berlengas Natural Reserve is a Portuguese natural reserve in the Berlengas, a small archipelago off the coast of Peniche, Portugal. Over 98% of its 95.6 km^{2} (36.9 sq mi) are marine. The symbol of the protected area is the common murre, which has, or had, its southernmost nidifying population in the islands.
