= Cabo Carvoeiro =

Cape in Peniche, Portugal

- Headland
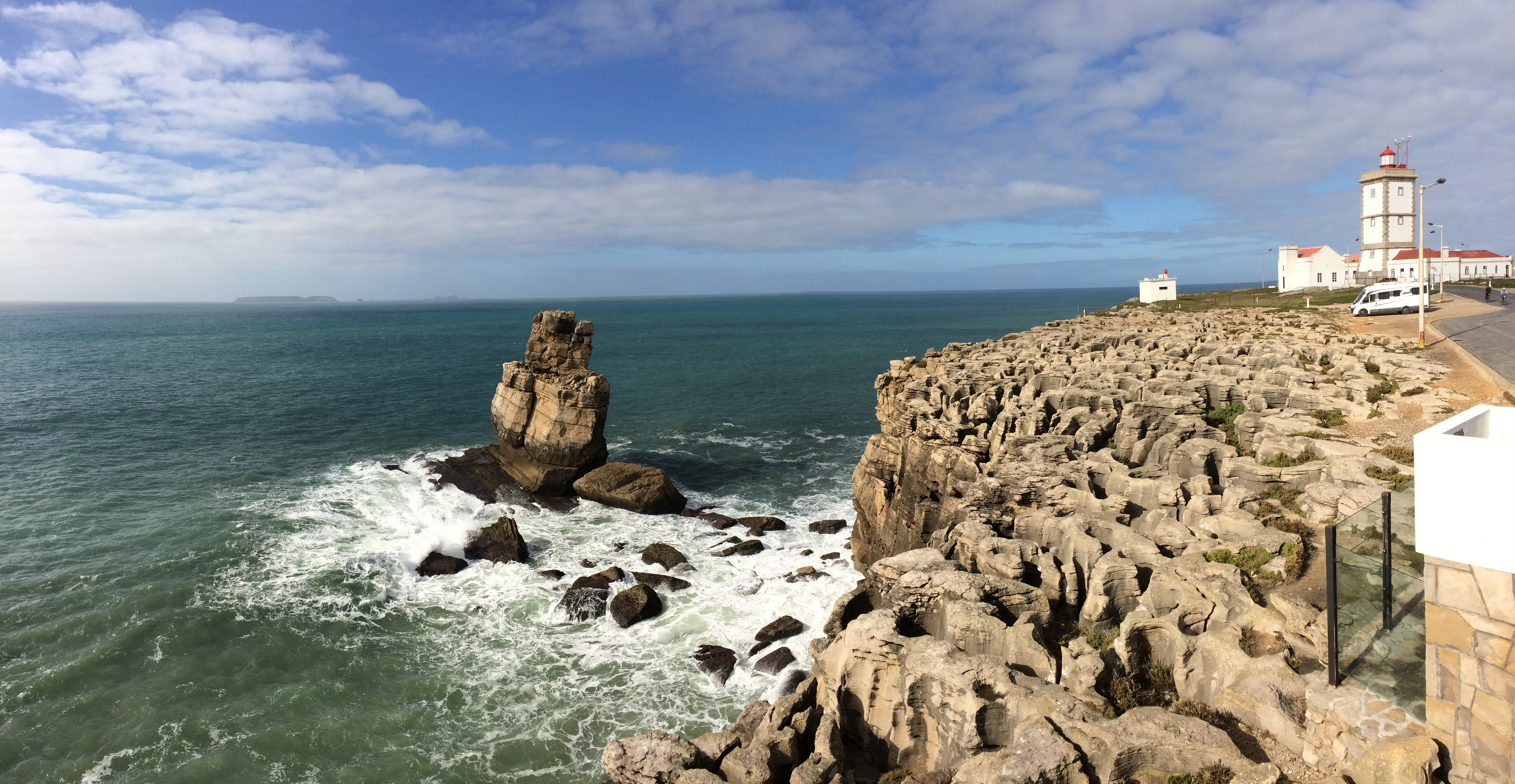
- The cape's lighthouse to the right, Nau dos Corvos (Carrack of Crows), to the left and the Berlengas in the far background

- Location within Portugal
- Coordinates: 39°21′34.46″N 9°24′29.78″W
- Location: Portugal, Peniche
- Water bodies: Atlantic Ocean
- Etymology: Carvoeiro: Portuguese for person who transports coal

Cabo Carvoeiro (Cape Carvoeiro) is cape which lies on the Atlantic coast, along the westernmost point of the Peniche Peninsula, in the civil parish of Peniche and the Oeste region. Opposite to the Berlengas archipelago, the cape is integrated into a natural terrestrial and maritime reserve, in the vicinity of Furninha, a site known for the discovery of prehistoric remains suggesting human occupation since the Neolithic.

Owing to historical storms and shipwrecks, a 25 m (82 ft) high lighthouse was constructed on the promontory to assist maritime shipping.

== See also ==
- Lighthouse of Cabo Carvoeiro
