= Furninha =

Cave and archaeological site in Portugal

- Gruta da Furninha
- Dominique's cave
- Location in Portugal
- 39°21′21″N 9°24′4″W

Furninha, also known as Dominique's cave, is a natural cave on the southern slope of the Peniche peninsula in Portugal. The cave is situated on the cliffs between the Peniche Fortress and the Cape Carvoeiro. The cave is located furthest west of any Neanderthal site. Neanderthals became extinct over 40,000 years ago. The cave was also inhabited by modern humans during the Neolithic.

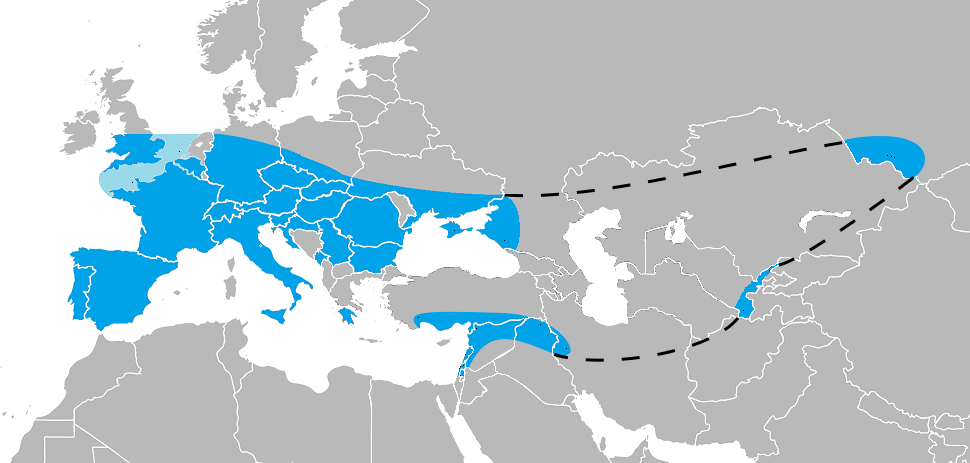
Maximum range of Homo neanderthalensis.

== History ==
Furninha was explored by Nery Delgado at the end of the 19th century. Delgado demonstrated the caves' history of habitation by Neanderthals. Delgado's excavation revealed the existence of animal occupation during the Lower Paleolithic, Neanderthal presence during the Middle Paleolithic, and the presence of Homo sapiens at the end of Chalcolithic. Delgado also reports the practice of anthropophagy by the Neanderthals of Furninha who, despite the proximity of the sea, were mainly hunters. The collection of remains gathered by Delgado was deposited in a Lisbon museum.

Observation of a number of photographs from Furninha reveals the existence of a thin film of flora. This flora is believed to be in close relation with fungi, and displays intense colors of green, yellow and red zones.

The walls of the cave are covered with nutrients generated by the mixing of rain water dropping through the vent of the vault with droplets of seawater entering the cave.

== In popular culture ==
- As a record of collective memory, the cave is known as the Cave of Dominique. Dominique was supposedly the name of an elusive robber who took refuge in Furninha.
- The Furninha cave is associated with the "Legend of a love in Peniche".
