= Nortada =

The Nortada ("north wind") is a summer wind along the west coast of the Iberian Peninsula from northerly directions, which occurs mainly between June and September.

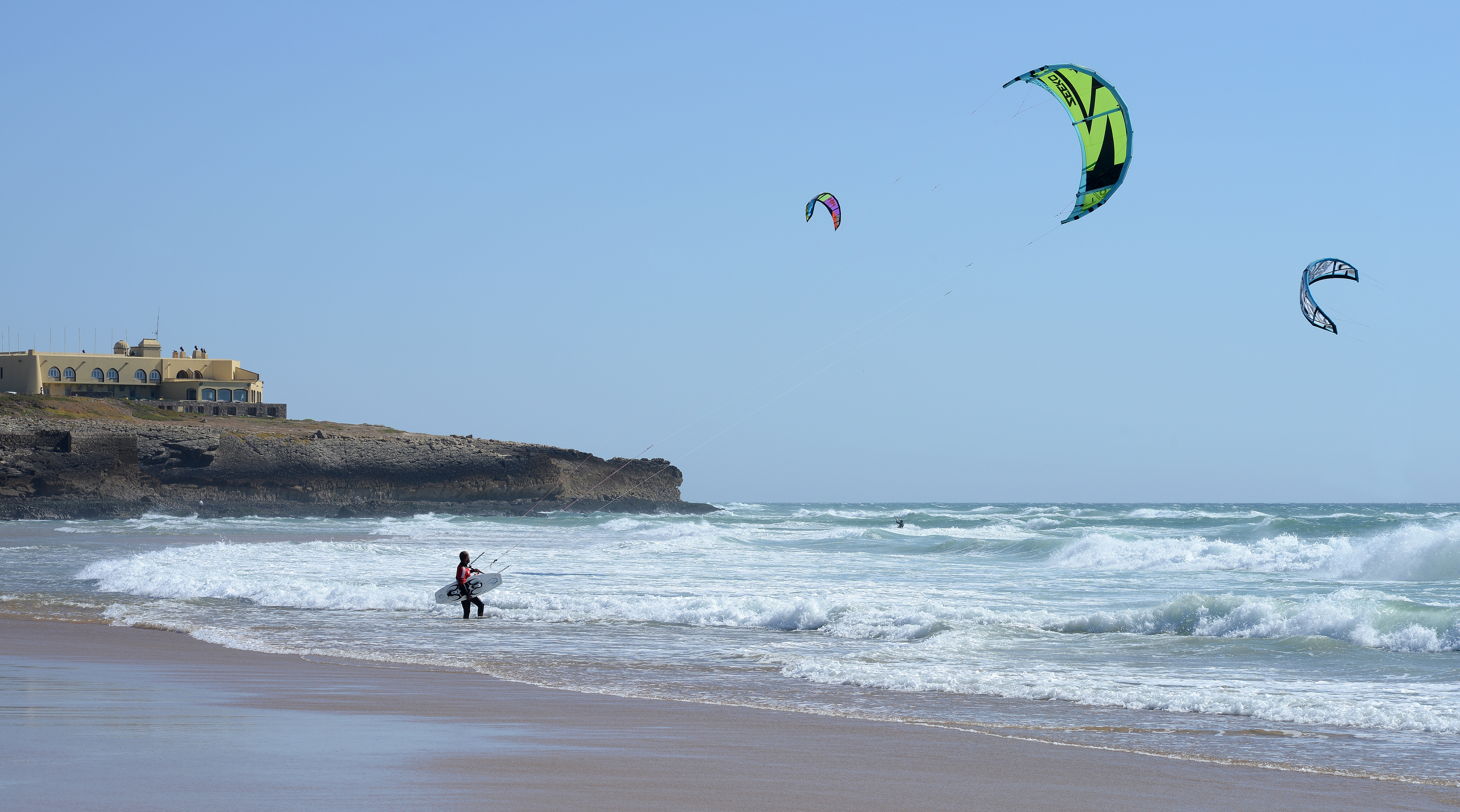
Praia do Guincho, where the Nortada is locally amplified.

The main wind direction is north-northwest. The wind is created primarily by a thermal low over the Iberian Peninsula and an Azores High above the Atlantic. The months with the highest frequency of heat lows thus coincide with the months of the most frequent occurrence of the Nortada. The wind is strengthened locally by thermal but also orographic influences, as, for instance, by mountain ranges. The wind often leads in the coastal area to coastal upwelling of cool water, which, in turn often leads to a strengthening of the wind.

A popular windsurfing and kitesurfing spot, where such a local amplification occurs, is for example the Praia do Guincho near Lisbon. A strengthening also occurs at the Praia do Martinhal in Sagres, where the wind blows then fully offshore.
