= Berlengas =

Island group

Native name: Arquipélago das Berlengas
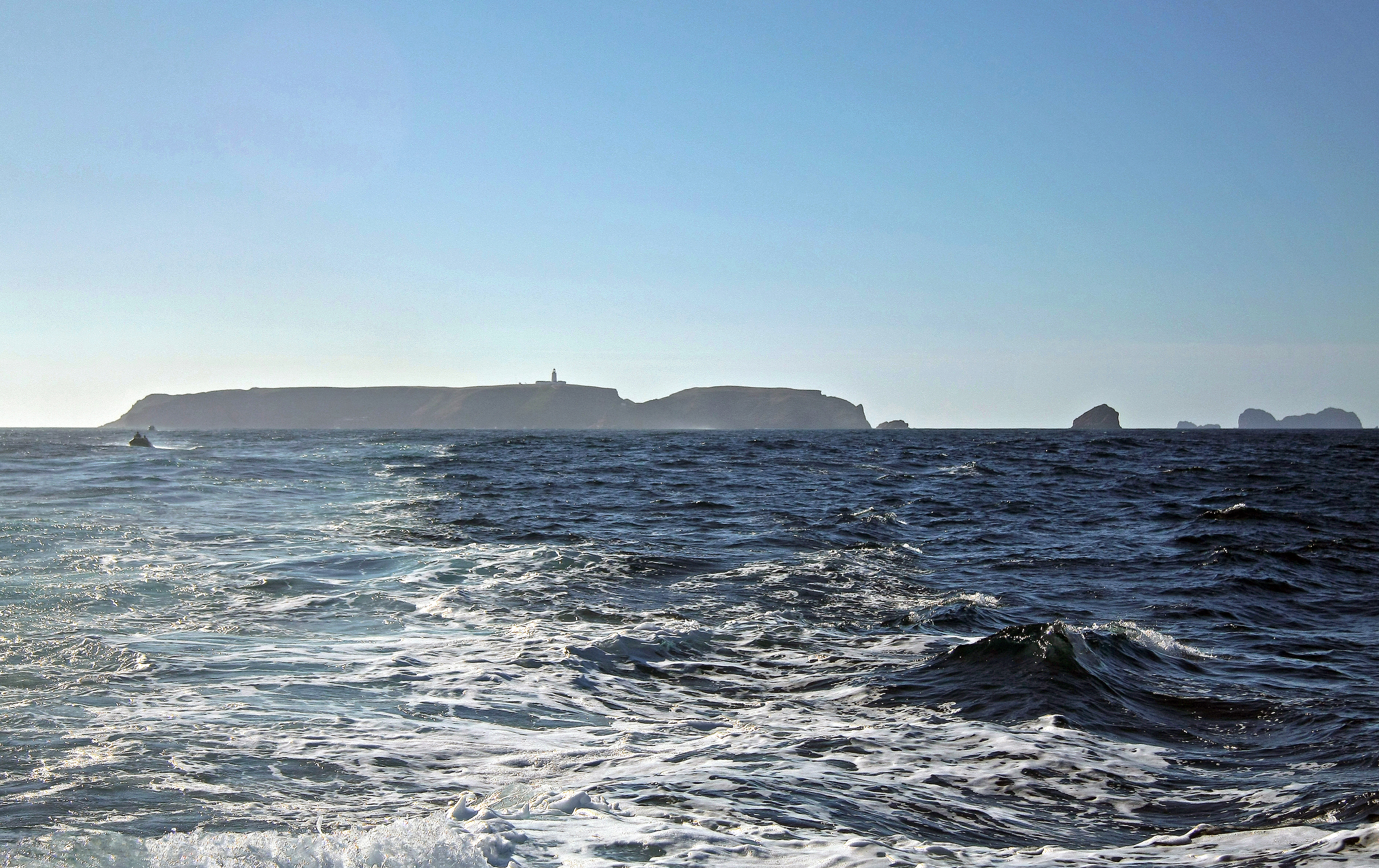
- Panoramic view of Berlengas islands.

- Location of the archipelago of the Berlengas

Geography
- Location: Atlantic Ocean
- Coordinates: 39.45°N 9.53°W
- Area: 1.04 km^{2} (0.40 sq mi)
- Length: 1.99 km (1.237 mi)
- Width: 8.57 km (5.325 mi)
- Highest elevation: 88 m (289 ft)

Administration
- Portugal
- Region: Centro
- Municipality: Peniche

Demographics
- Population: no permanent habitation

The Berlengas are a Portuguese archipelago consisting of small Atlantic islands 10 to 17 kilometres (6.2–10.6 miles; 5.4–9.2 nautical miles) off the coast of Peniche, Portugal, in the Oeste region. These islands were traditionally known to British mariners as "the Burlings". The only inhabited island is its largest island, Berlenga Grande, although there is currently no permanent habitation in the archipelago. The other islands are grouped into two groups of islets, the Estelas Islets and the Farilhões-Forcados Islets.

== History ==
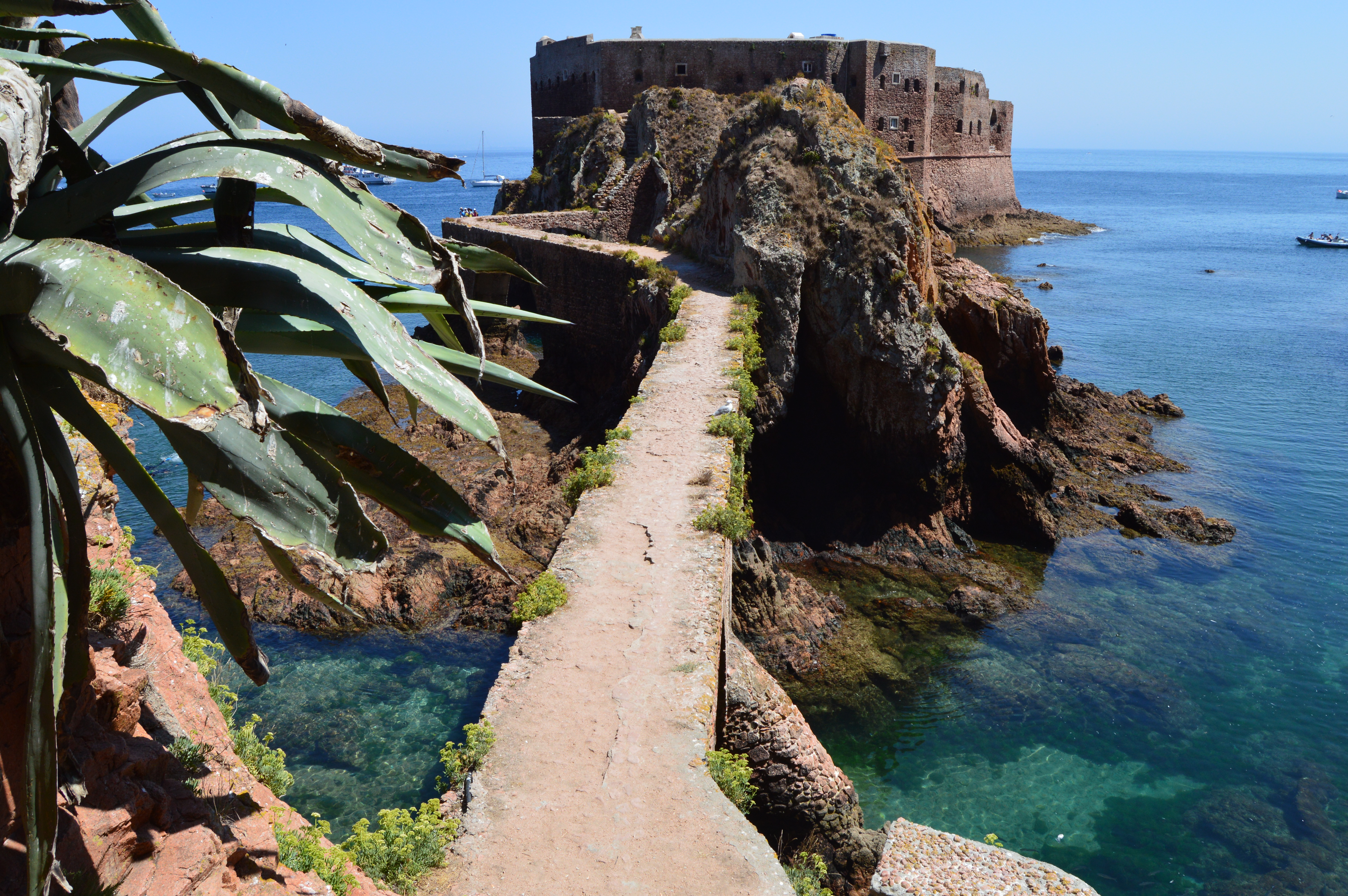
The historic penal colony: the Fort of São João Baptista das Berlengas

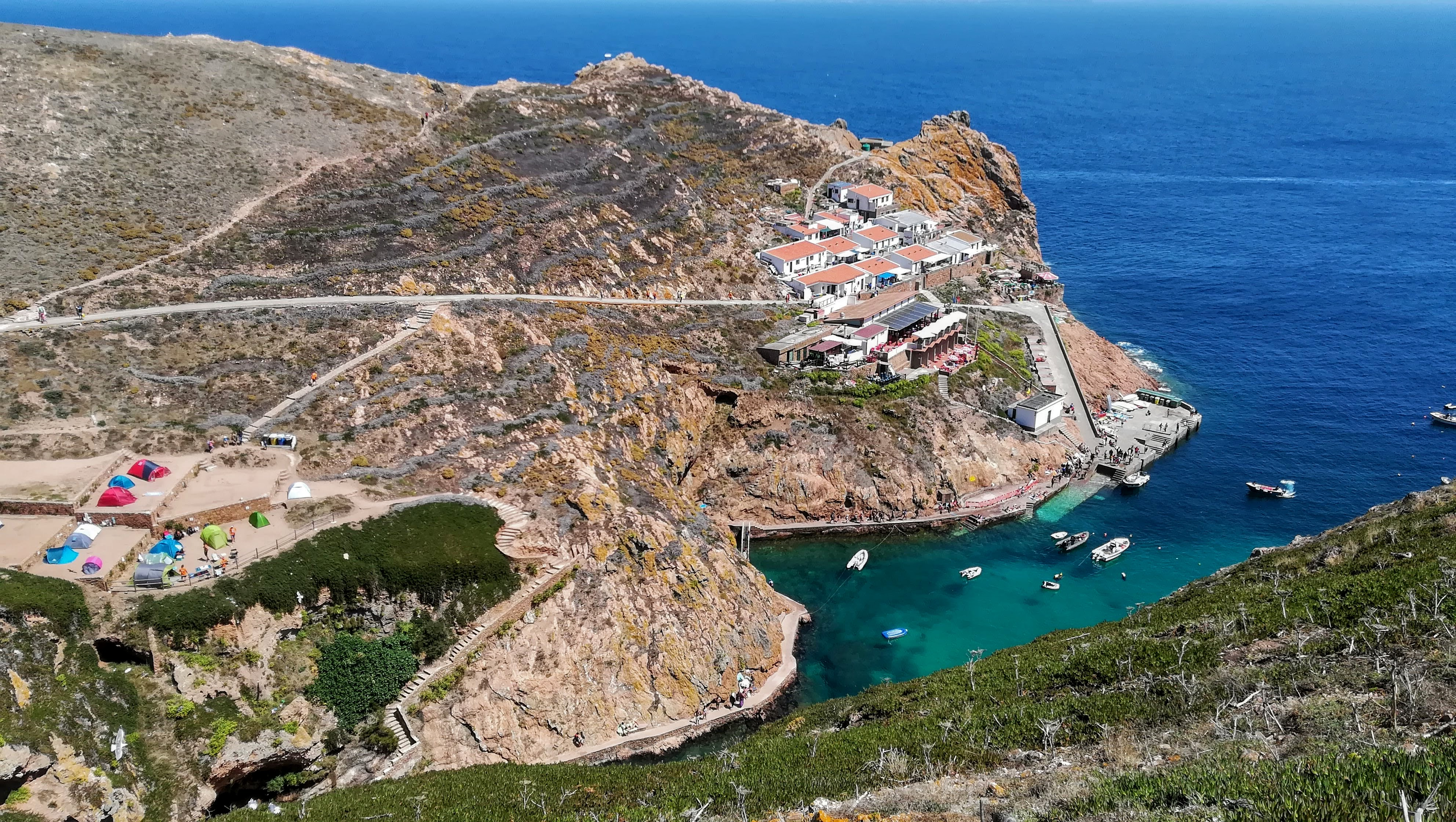
The fishermen houses in the Berlenga Grande Island are the only dwellings in the archipelago.

Human occupation on Berlenga Grande dates back to antiquity: the islands are referred to in Ptolemy's Geography as Λονδοβρίς (Londobris). Much later it was referred to as the island of Saturno by Roman geographers, and was visited successively by Muslims, Vikings and privateers.

The islands are thought to be a former sacred place adopted by the Phoenicians in the first millennium BC where the cult of Baal–Melqart was celebrated.

In 1513, with the support of Queen Eleanor of Viseu, monks from the Order of São Jerónimo established a settlement on the island to offer assistance to navigation and victims of frequent shipwrecks. The monastery founded there, the Monastery of the Misericórdia da Berlenga, remained until the 16th century, when disease, lack of supplies and poor communication (due to constant inclement weather) forced the monks to abandon their service on the island.

After the Portuguese Restoration War, during the reign of King John IV, the council of war determined that the demolition of the monastery ruins and the use of their rocks to build a coastal defense would help protect the coastal settlements; the Fort of São João Baptista das Berlengas was constructed from the remnants of the monastery ruins. By 1655, it had already, during its construction, resisted an assault by three Barbary Coast pirates.

The island's lighthouse (dubbed Duke of Braganza by locals) was constructed in 1841. In the 20th century a solar panel was installed in the lighthouse's 29-metre (95 ft) column, providing a 50-kilometre (31 mi) field of vision.

The International Coordinating Council of UNESCO's Man and the Biosphere Programme (MAB), meeting in Dresden (Germany) from 28 June to 1 July, while adding 18 new sites, included the Berlengas to the World Network of Biosphere Reserves (WNBR): in a statement on 30 June 2011, the list of classified reserves were presented.

== Geography ==
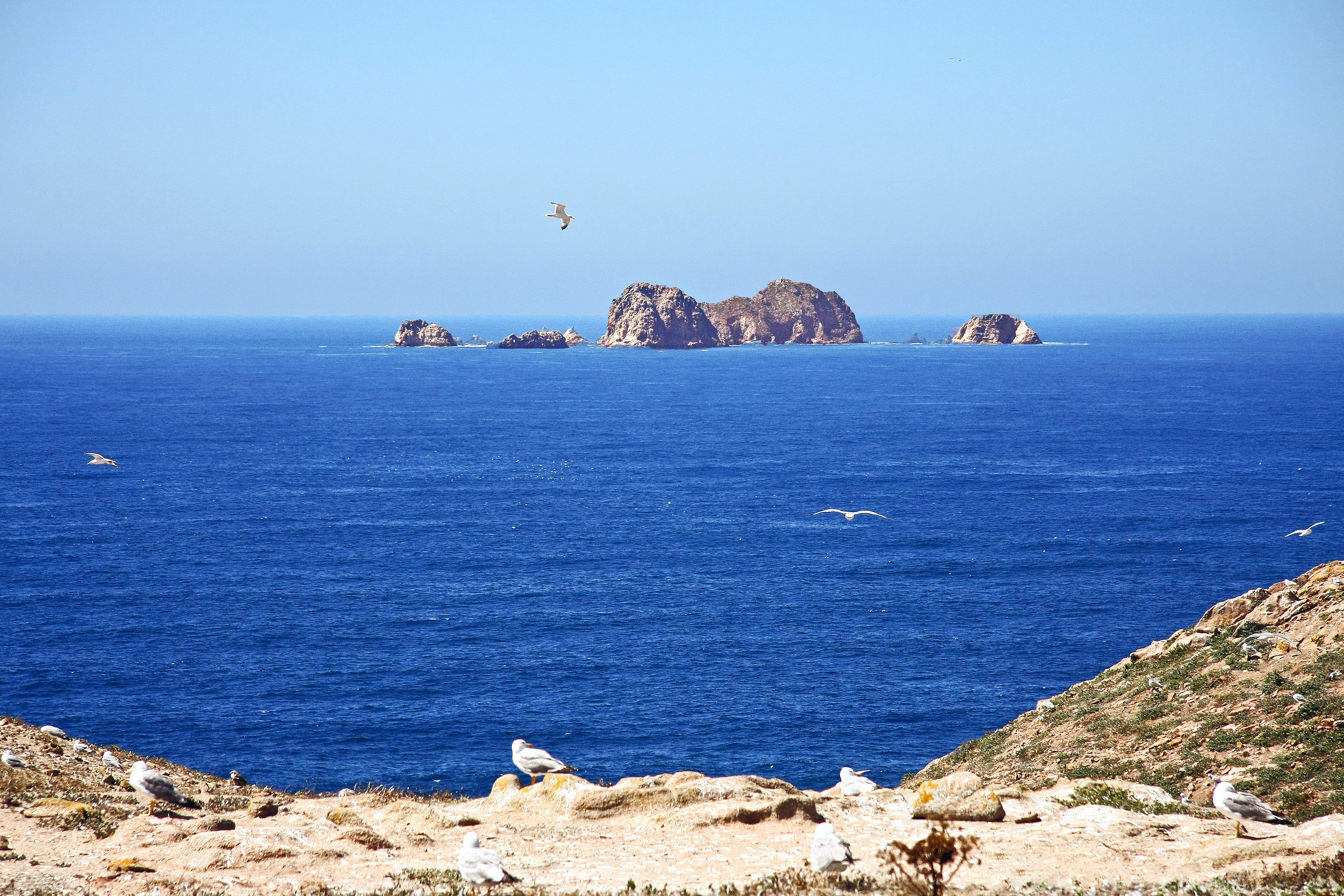
Farilhões-Forcados Islets seen from Berlenga Grande

The archipelago is made up of the largest island, Berlenga Grande, and two groups of smaller islets, the Estelas Inlets and the Farilhões-Forcados Islets. As the archipelago has been declared a reservation area for the protection of the local fauna (primarily sea birds), it is only visited by scientists and, in the summer, by a number of tourists.

There is little soil on the rocky archipelago, so little plant life is supported. Sea birds and marine life, such as mackerel, mullet, and swordfish are abundant.

=== Berlenga Grande ===
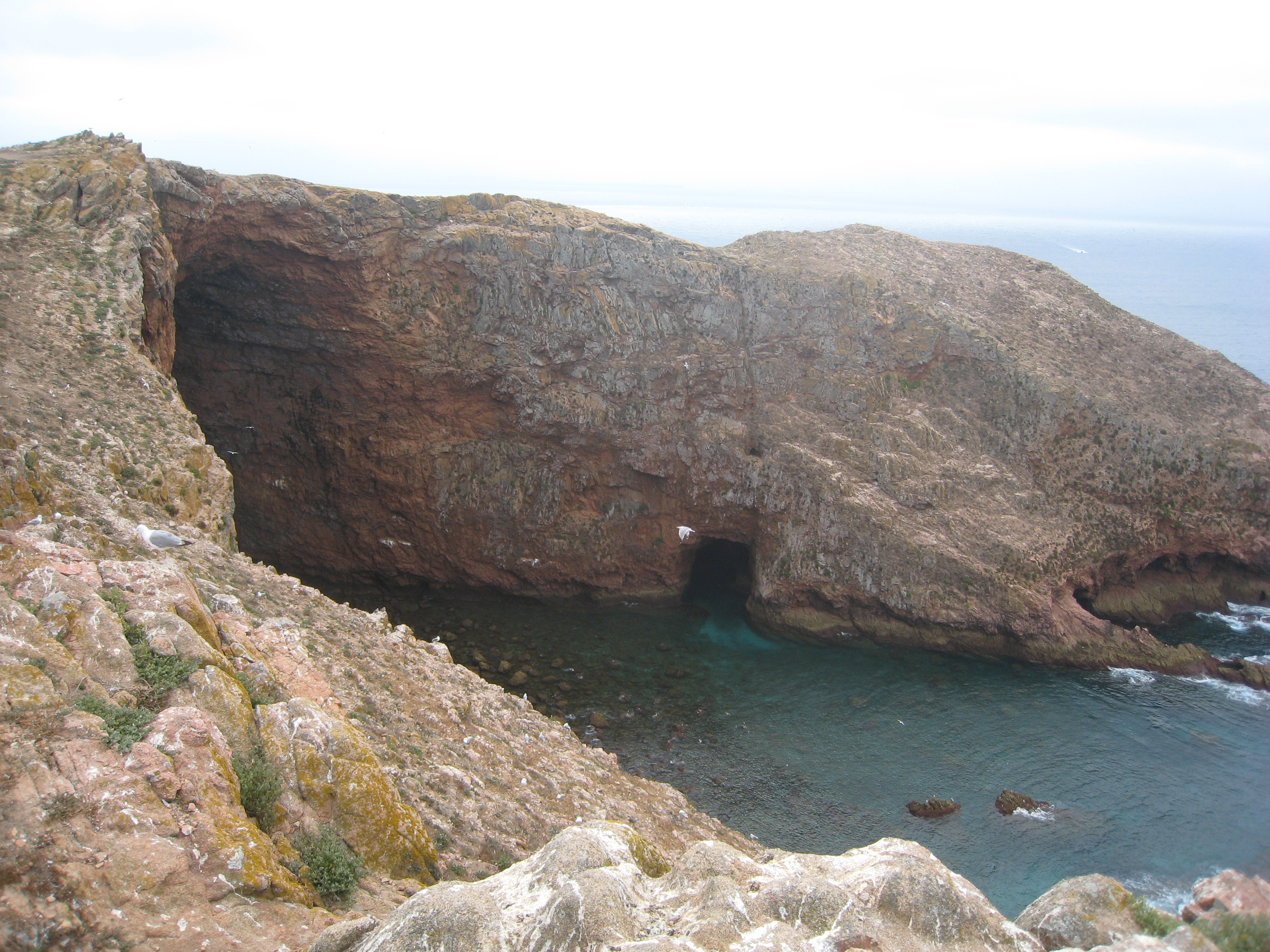
Entry to Furado Grande

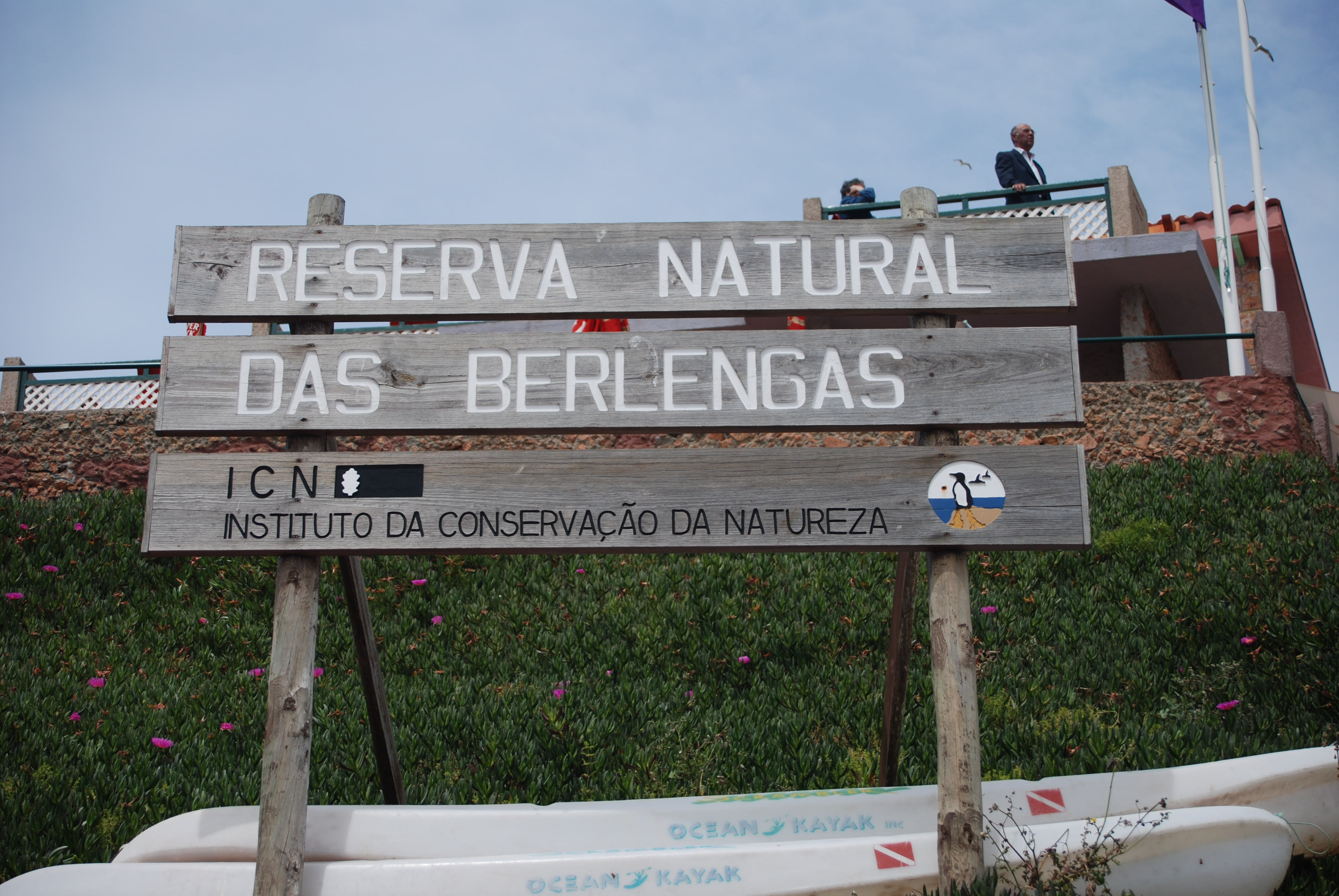
Berlenga Grande is part of the Reserva Natural das Berlengas, a protected area home to marine species of flora and fauna.

At 1.5 kilometres (0.9 mi) long and 0.8 kilometres (0.50 mi) wide, Berlenga Grande is the largest of the islands of the Berlengas Archipelago. At its highest, it rises to 88 metres (289 ft) above sea level. The island has a number of notable caves, including Gruta Azul (English: "Blue Cave") and Furado Grande (English: "Big Hole"). The Furado Grande is a natural tunnel 70 metres (230 ft) wide and 20 metres (66 ft) tall which crosses through the entire island before opening up into a dramatic bay.

The Fort of São João Baptista (English: "Fort of St. John the Baptist") is located in the waters off the southeastern coast of Berlenga Grande, on a small islet connected to the island by a causeway/arch-bridge and anchorage to the north. It has been retrofitted as a rest house for tourists to stay at while visiting the islands.

=== Farilhões-Forcadas Islets ===
The Farilhões-Forcadas Islets are uninhabited islands located northwest of Berlenga Grande.

=== Geology ===
Geology of the archipelago: Granites of the Berlengas Magmatic mica schist

These islands consist of a pink granite very rare in Europe and very common in America, rich in feldspars. Erosion has created remarkable landforms, such as the "sugar loaf", or even narrow valleys with almost vertical walls (the carreiros, formed by selective erosion along subvertical fault planes), as well as numerous caves and marine tunnels

The different groups of islands have different morphology, composition and origins. Berlenga Grande and Estelas are of igneous origin, composed of pink granites, and occur in outcrops with rounded morphologies, generally with flattened tops. The Farilhões Forcadas group, on the other hand, consists of metamorphic rocks, where reliefs characterized by sharp peaks and vertical cliffs stand out.

Berlenga Island is a pink granite plateau with rounded shapes, marked by a jagged coastline, where several coves, caves, arches, paths, small islets and rocks stand out. All these landforms were shaped by the continuous action of erosive processes over a long period of time. The embedded and relatively aligned paths of Cações and Mosteiro stand out, which almost separate the island of Berlenga into two fragments, the Ilha Velha and the Berlenga itself, and give it a curious figure-eight shape.

It is hypothesized that the archipelago had its origin on a horst. Its absence on the Mesozoic suggests that, during this time, the Berlengas block was essentially subjected to erosive processes. The pink granite fragments and metamorphic rocks found at Cabo Carvoeiro or Baleal, as well as in the Papoa tuff breccia, similar to those recognized in the archipelago, confirms this hypothesis. It is also expected that this block was larger and had a different configuration than it currently has.

The absence of morphological structures typical of the erosion of granitic massifs and soils on the surface of Berlenga Grande suggest that it was underwater for long periods of time. Its rounded shape and the relatively flat surface of its top propounds the presence of an ancient marine abrasion platform, confirmed by the presence of numerous erosive forms, such as potholes, which developed on top of the applanation surface when it was at the bottom of the sea.

On the other hand, the existence of small cavities and caves in the cliffs above the current mean sea level, such as Furado Seco, and marine terraces that correspond to residual deposits of old beaches, located at similar altitudes, seem to indicate that sea level was once positioned on that horizon. These observations suggest significant variations in the mean sea level, possibly as a result of quaternary glaciations.

Additionally, Berlenga Grande has a poorly developed drainage network, (when precipitation occurs, rainwater is taken and falls directly into the sea in cascades), which clearly evidences that the erosion rate of the granitic massif is lower than the speed of variations in the mean sea level.

The older metamorphic rocks that outcrop in Farilhões and Forcadas are erosion-resistance peaks of an underwater mountain that widens considerably below sea level. These rocks are strongly deformed and contain textures and minerals characteristic of high pressure and high temperature environments, typical of the lower crust.

== Climate ==
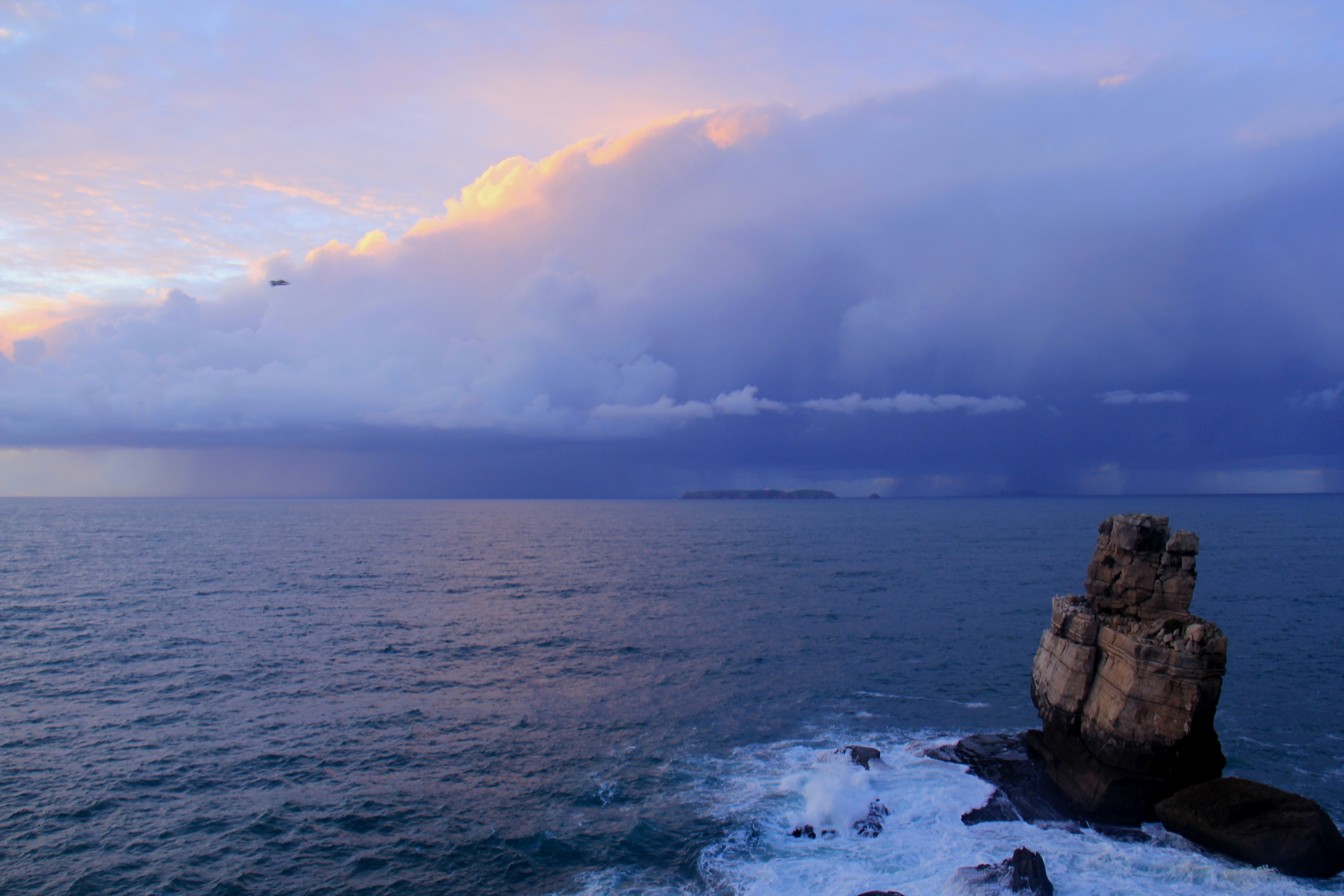
A November storm approaching the islands

The Berlengas have a Mediterranean climate (Köppen: Csb) dominated by the Atlantic, especially on the northern and northwestern coasts, where strong winds are felt. Heavy rains in winter alternate with periods of drought, between spring and autumn.

The climate of the archipelago is strongly influenced by the winds, very strong on the north-facing cliffs and more moderate on the southern coasts. These wind currents affect the distribution of flora and fauna in the islands. This climatic feature endows the archipelago with a unique ecosystem, both on land and at sea level.

The presence close to the mainland, whose coast is oriented north–south, also strongly influences the climatic characteristics of the island, especially in summer. In this season, the differential warming of the sea and the land causes the formation of a sea breeze during the day. This breeze strengthens the main wind current associated with the Azores High and gives rise to a wind regime known as the Nortada. These winds push surface waters offshore, causing cold waters from deeper layers of the water to replace warm surface waters in an upwelling process. This phenomenon causes frequent mists during summer and results in nutrient enrichment of surface water.

Average monthly temperatures in summer are cool (below 20 °C (68 °F)) and highs rarely exceed 25 °C (77 °F). In winter, the monthly averages remain high (above 12 °C (54 °F)) and the minimum above 10 °C (50 °F). The thermal amplitude (both diurnal temperature variation and yearly temperature variation) therefore remains moderate.

Due to generally cloudy conditions in the winter and the summer morning fog, the archipelago has a relatively low number of sunshine hours, though clear sky afternoons are frequent in the summer.

Averages for the closest point on the mainland to the islands, Cabo Carvoeiro, are expressed in the climate box below:

Climate data for Cabo Carvoeiro, Peniche, 1991–2020 normals and extremes, 1971-2000 sunshine hours and humidity
Month	Jan	Feb	Mar	Apr	May	Jun	Jul	Aug	Sep	Oct	Nov	Dec	Year
Record high °C (°F)	19.9 (67.8)	22.0 (71.6)	27.8 (82.0)	27.5 (81.5)	32.1 (89.8)	30.3 (86.5)	31.0 (87.8)	36.7 (98.1)	33.3 (91.9)	31.1 (88.0)	24.1 (75.4)	20.5 (68.9)	36.7 (98.1)
Mean daily maximum °C (°F)	14.5 (58.1)	14.7 (58.5)	15.9 (60.6)	16.6 (61.9)	18.2 (64.8)	19.8 (67.6)	20.5 (68.9)	21.2 (70.2)	20.9 (69.6)	19.6 (67.3)	17.0 (62.6)	15.3 (59.5)	17.9 (64.1)
Daily mean °C (°F)	12.2 (54.0)	12.5 (54.5)	13.7 (56.7)	14.6 (58.3)	16.2 (61.2)	18.0 (64.4)	18.7 (65.7)	19.2 (66.6)	18.8 (65.8)	17.5 (63.5)	14.9 (58.8)	13.0 (55.4)	15.8 (60.4)
Mean daily minimum °C (°F)	9.9 (49.8)	10.3 (50.5)	11.5 (52.7)	12.5 (54.5)	14.3 (57.7)	16.2 (61.2)	16.9 (62.4)	17.2 (63.0)	16.7 (62.1)	15.3 (59.5)	12.8 (55.0)	10.8 (51.4)	13.7 (56.7)
Record low °C (°F)	2.0 (35.6)	1.5 (34.7)	0.0 (32.0)	6.0 (42.8)	7.6 (45.7)	10.2 (50.4)	13.8 (56.8)	12.5 (54.5)	11.0 (51.8)	9.5 (49.1)	6.1 (43.0)	2.8 (37.0)	0.0 (32.0)
Average rainfall mm (inches)	75.8 (2.98)	55.1 (2.17)	48.8 (1.92)	47.7 (1.88)	35.8 (1.41)	12.3 (0.48)	5.2 (0.20)	10.7 (0.42)	25.2 (0.99)	84.6 (3.33)	98.0 (3.86)	68.6 (2.70)	567.8 (22.34)
Average rainy days (≥ 1 mm)	10.4	7.6	7.6	7.7	5.4	2.2	0.9	1.8	4.1	9.2	10.5	9.4	76.8
Average relative humidity (%) (at 9:00 UTC)	82	81	80	80	83	85	88	89	88	85	82	82	84
Mean monthly sunshine hours	132.6	122.1	172.8	194.1	223.0	222.7	245.0	253.9	196.0	171.1	136.2	122.3	2,191.8
Percentage possible sunshine	44	40	46	49	50	50	54	60	53	50	45	42	49
Source: Instituto Português do Mar e da Atmosfera

Average wind speed (km/h)
	Jan	Feb	Mar	Apr	May	Jun	Jul	Aug	Sep	Oct	Nov	Dec	Year
Cabo Carvoeiro	19.6	19.7	19.2	19.0	18.1	16.9	17.3	16.3	15.2	16.8	18.4	20.0	18.0

== Terrestrial biome ==
=== Flora ===
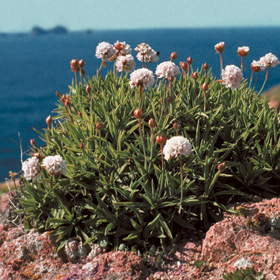
Armeria berlengensis, an endemic of the archipelago

The flora of the Berlengas mainly consists of bushes and grasses, adapted to the strong winds, high aridity and salinity, some of them are common on the coastal mainland, others are endemic to the islands. There are two known endemic species to the islands, Armeria berlengensis and Pulicaria microcephala; and two subspecies, Echium rosulatum subsp. davaei and Herniaria lusitanica subsp. berlengiana.

There are around 100 different plant species present on the archipelago.

Human presence led to the introduction of exotic species, like the ice plant and small mammals like the European rabbit and the black rat who work to diminish the native population.

=== Fauna ===
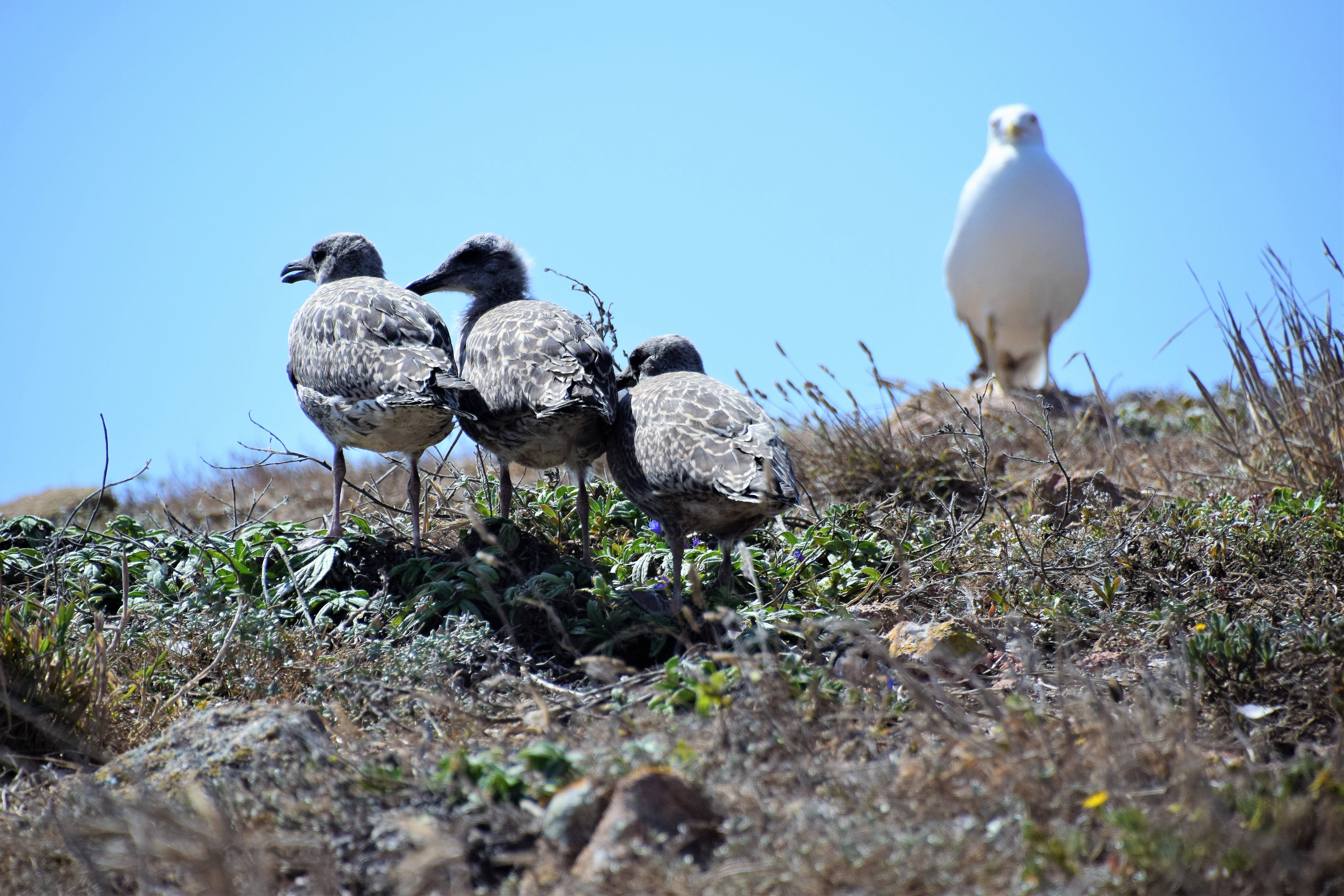
Seagull monitoring its offspring in one of the islands

There are two species of lizard in the islands, the Carbonell's wall lizard (subs. berlengensis) and the ocellated lizard, although this last one is residual and is only seen in restricted areas of the islands such as caves and is thought to be different from the continental relatives, showing different morphological traits and demeanor.

The Berlengas archipelago is an important breeding area for seabirds such as the lesser black-backed gull and the yellow-legged gull, whose population increased dramatically due to artificial feeding and has become a serious problem in some cases, and land birds like the black redstart and the peregrine falcon. It is also in the southernmost range of the common murre (adopted as the symbol of the nature reserve) and is one of the few breeding locations of the band-rumped storm petrel.

A new endemic species of snail, Oestophora barrelsi spec. nov was described in 2015.

== Marine biome ==
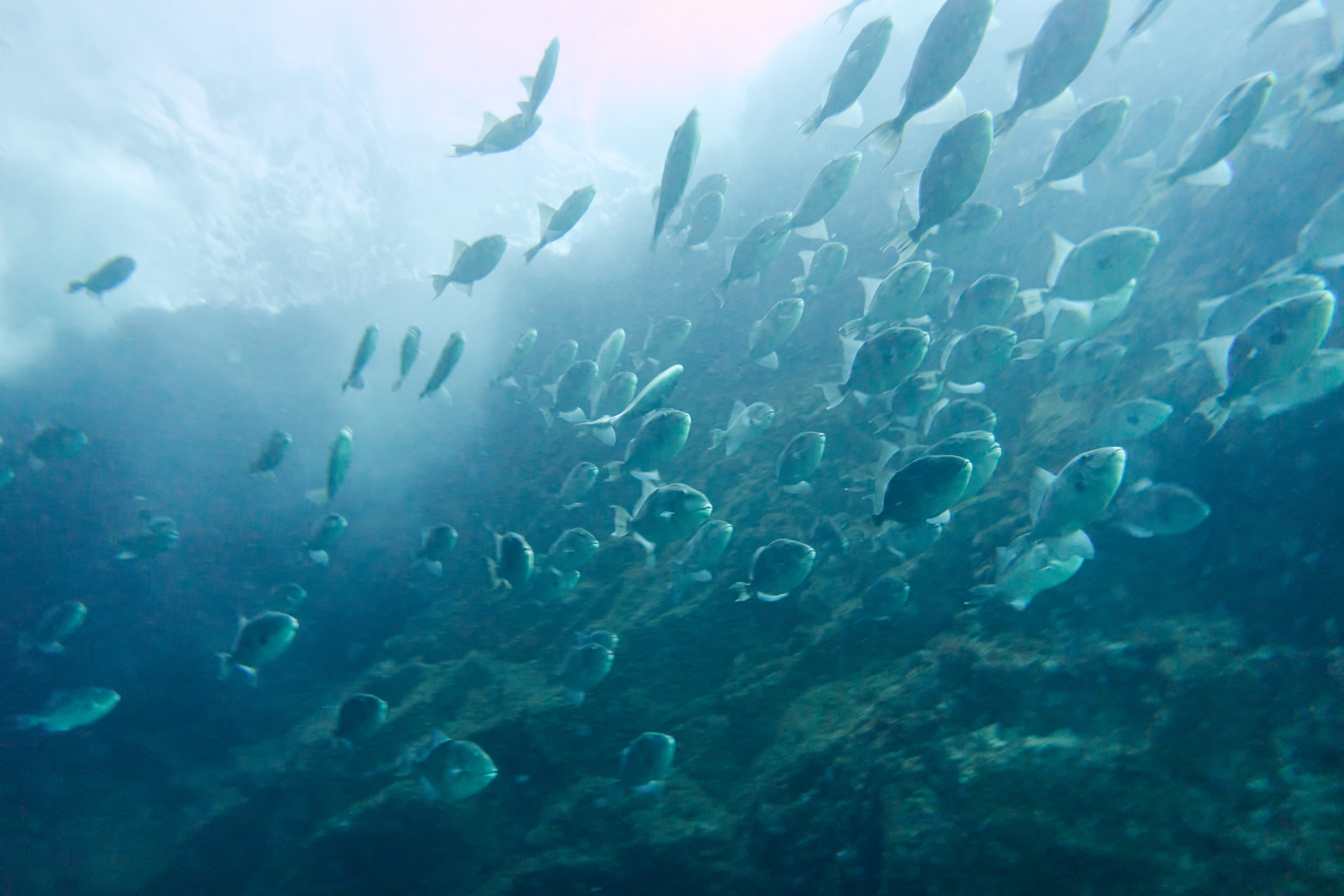
School of grey triggerfish

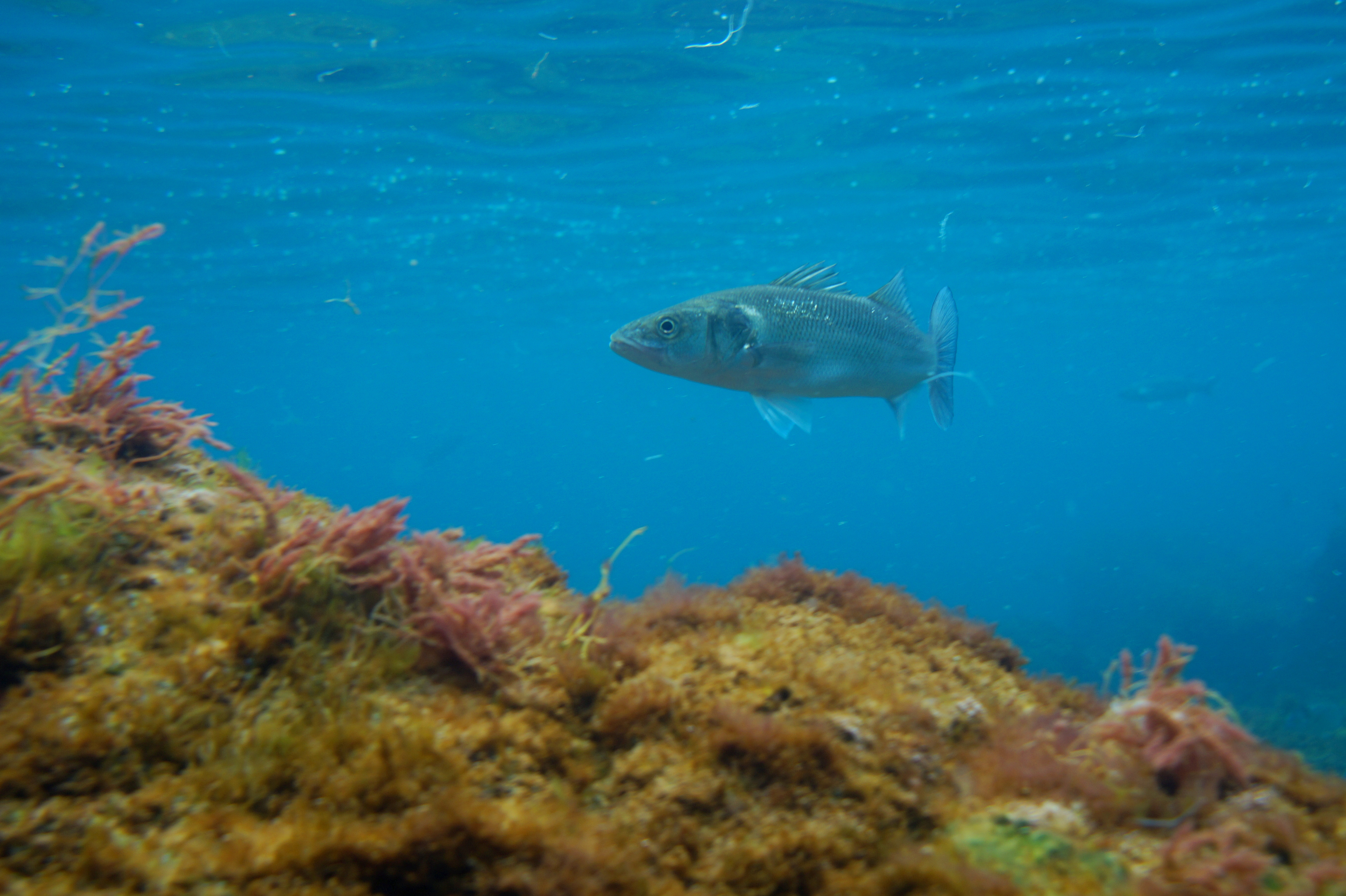
The European bass, a common sight near the islands

The Berlengas archipelago is situated off of Peniche, south of the Nazaré Canyon and on the edge of the continental shelf (in Farilhões Islets) on a maritime zone known by its relatively high biological productivity, acting as a meeting point between coastal and oceanic fish species. On the other hand, the upwelling currents originating in deep waters contribute to the development of an aquatic fauna with evident commercial interest. Its variety of fish and marine mammals, marine plants and other marine organisms as led to its classification as a marine reserve.

=== Fish ===
The water around the islands hosts a great variety of fish, at least 44 species are known from two study expeditions. The most frequently observed fish is the common two-banded sea bream and the ballan wrasse, along with the European bass, the red porgy, the gilt-head bream and the dusky grouper, frequent on Farilhões Islets.

In the 1950s the islands were an important spawning ground for school sharks.

=== Marine mammals ===
The oceanographic conditions of the archipelago commonly lead to an abundant ichthyofauna, represented by sardines and other species that feed on plankton. This attracts a lot of marine mammals, mainly cetaceans, whose species include the common dolphin, the common bottlenose dolphin, the harbour porpoise, the striped dolphin, the common minke whale and the Cuvier's beaked whale.

== Wrecks ==
A number of ships have wrecked on the Berlengas throughout documented history.

In 1808, HMS Milbrook wrecked on Berlenga Grande in a gale, though without loss of life.

== Culture ==
Berlenga Grande did star in a post-revolutionary Portuguese film called O Rei das Berlengas (The King of the Berlengas), a comedy about someone who decides to become king of the archipelago. In this movie, several people, tourists and residents from the nearby towns, attempt to declare the independence of the islands, and declare themselves as king, prince or president of the Berlengas. These declarations and liberation armies are nothing more than fiction intended for amusement.

== See also ==
- List of islands of Portugal
