= Atouguia da Baleia =

- Civil parish
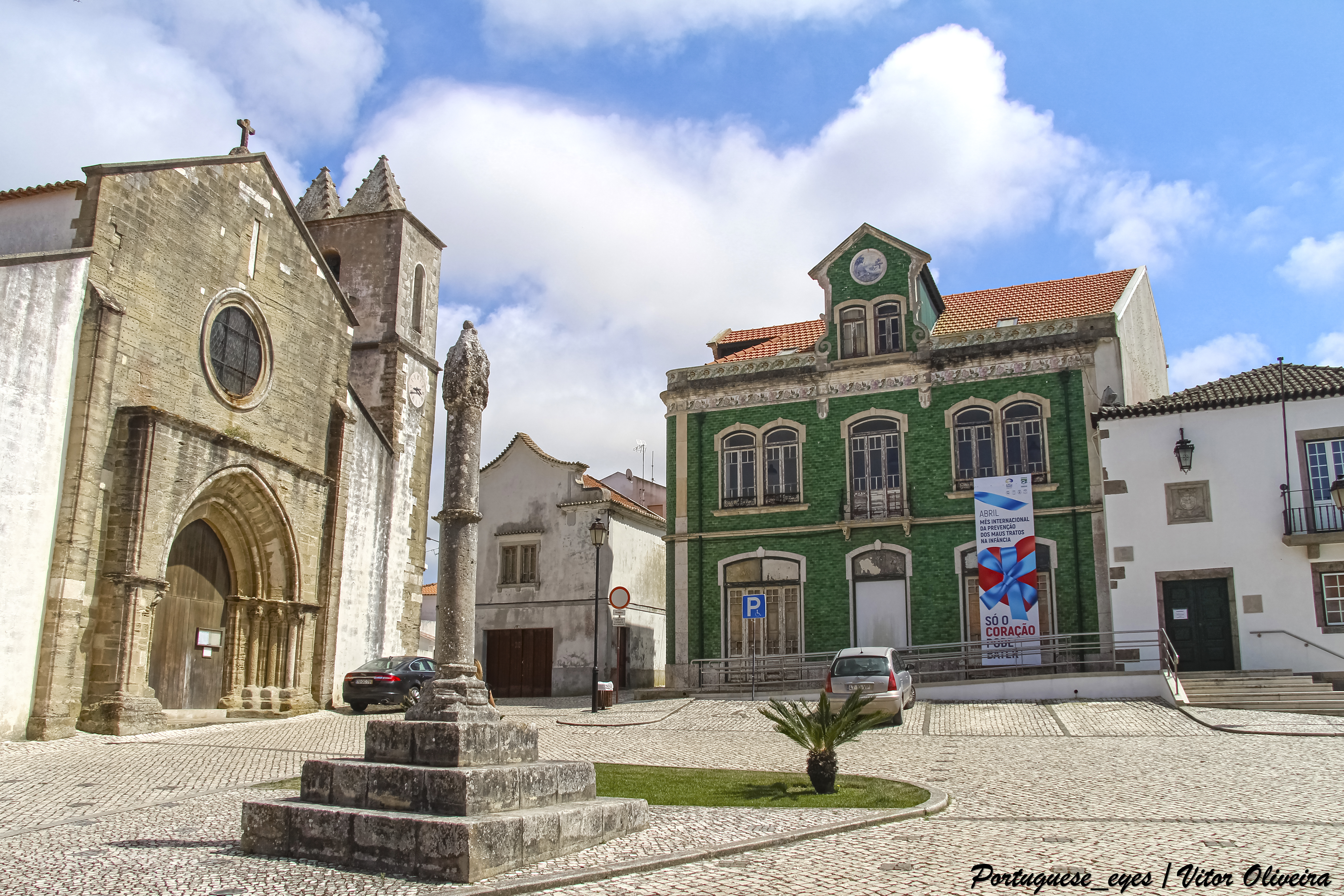

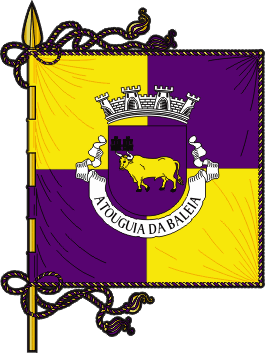
- Flag

- Location in Portugal
- Coordinates: 39.337°N 9.325°W
- Country: Portugal
- Region: Oeste e Vale do Tejo
- Intermunic. comm.: Oeste
- District: Leiria
- Municipality: Peniche

Area
  - Total: 47.02 km^{2} (18.15 sq mi)

Population (2011)
  - Total: 8,954
  - Density: 190.4/km^{2} (493.2/sq mi)
- Time zone: UTC+00:00 (WET)
  - Summer (DST): UTC+01:00 (WEST)

Atouguia da Baleia is a parish in the municipality of Peniche, in Portugal. The population in 2011 was 8,954, in an area of 47.02 km^{2}. The village of Atouguia da Baleia proper has almost 2,000 residents.

The geology of Atouguia da Baleia is Late Jurassic Lourinhã Fm., where the dinosaur Miragaia longicollum was found.
