= Praia d'El Rey =

Beach resort in Portugal

Praia d'El Rey Golf & Beach Resort is a commercial tourism, golf and residential beach resort on Portugal's western Atlantic coast 106 kilometres north of the country's capital, Lisbon.

It covers an area of 240 acres (0.97 km^{2}) and is between the fishing town of Peniche, in Oeste Subregion, to the south and Obidos Lagoon to its north.

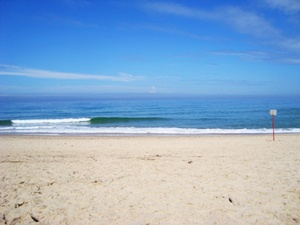
The view from Praia d'El Rey of the beach and ocean in front of it.

The first properties built within the site in the late 1990s were near to its gated entrance, followed later by a Marriott Hotel and several hundred more private villas, townhouses and apartments - which are owned mostly by Irish, British and Scandinavian nationals. Properties within the resort are usually either second/holiday homes or lived in year-round by retirees.

In 1997 a links golf course was opened on the site designed by Cabell B. Robinson, an American golf course architect.

This championship course is 6,625 metres long and a par 73 and is considered by many golfers to one of the more challenging courses in Portugal being both a links course when next to the beach, but also travels through wooded areas and is overlooked by houses.

Praia d'El Rey, which recently won a travel award, is also a beach resort and residents and visitors are able to gain access to the area's beach.

== Marriott Hotel ==
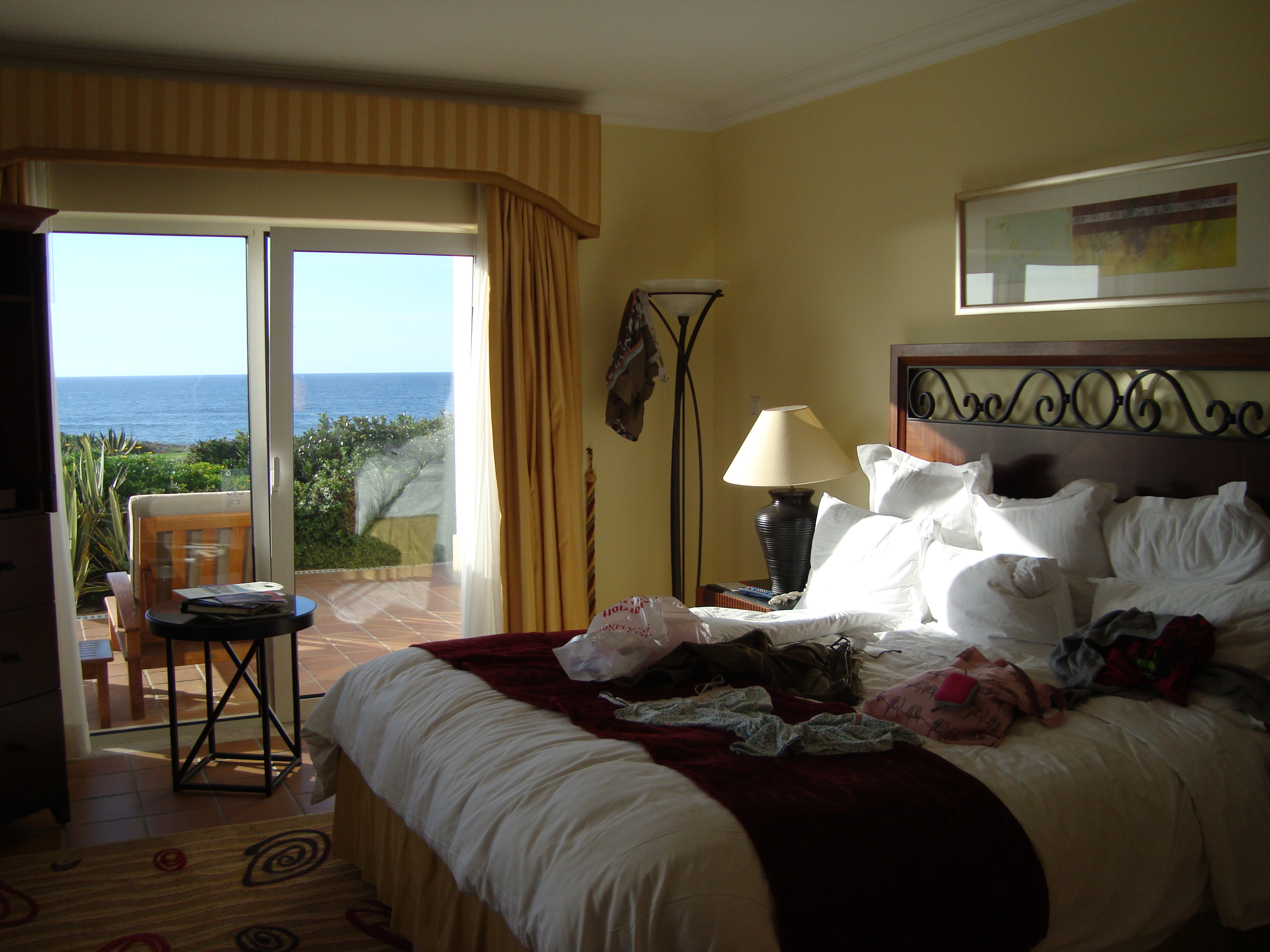
One of the sea-view suites at the Praia d'El Rey Marriott Hotel

The Praia d'El Rey Golf and Beach Resort includes a five-star Marriott hotel at the centre of the resort which has 179 rooms plus three bars and three restaurants. There is also a main outdoor swimming pool and an indoor pool and spa/gym plus meeting rooms, a large entry vestibule and beach side facilities.

The hotel, which at the moment is believed to be the only five-star hotel on Portugal's western coastline, is regularly used by Portugal's national football team, whose players and managers both stay at the hotel and use the resort's UEFA-standard football pitches to practice on—often in the days before a big home match.

== Property ==
As well as the resort's hotel and golf facilities there are also approximately 800 properties within the site which are all privately owned. These have been built over the past decade as the resort has expanded and work continues to build more in at least three areas. Existing properties can be purchased as resales, off-plan and newly built and include villas, townhouses and apartments.

== Sports facilities ==
As well as its championship golf course, Praia d'El Rey Golf and Beach Resort includes a practice range, UEFA-standard football pitches and seven tennis courts. Visitors and residents are also able to mountain bike, horse ride and surf in the area. The resort's beach is open to the general public and there are several surf spots directly opposite the Beachfront Apartments complex.

== Location and history ==
Praia d'El Rey is in the Vale de Janelas (Windows Valley), also known locally as the Sítio dos Belgas (Small farm of the Belgians). The resort takes its name from the Serra d'El-Rei (King's Mountain Range) where Peter I of Portugal had a castle where he used to meet his mistress Dona Inês. This history is reflected in the resort's streets names. The main street is called Avenida D. Pedro and an adjoining street is called Avenida Dona Inês de Castro.

The site was bought by a group of Dutch investors who formed the Beltico Group in the late 1960s to develop commercial residential and tourism projects in the UK, Portugal and Brazil, and construction began at Praia d'El Rey in the late 1990s, including the first properties and facilities on-site. But, after a period, the majority shareholding in Beltico was sold by the original investors to a new, largely British-owned consortium. Beltico has completed residential and commercial construction projects in the UK, runs a specialist residential development firm called Qube, is building three resorts similar to Praia d'El Rey in Brazil, owns Portugal's largest golf course construction company, and has interests in construction, oil and gas production and residential real estate in the UK, Portugal and elsewhere.
