= Carlos Alexandre Rodrigues =

Portuguese visual artist

- Born: 1979 (age 46–47); Caldas da Rainha, Portugal
- Website: carlosalexandrerodrigues.weebly.com

Carlos Alexandre Rodrigues (born 1979) is a Portuguese visual artist who lives and works in Caldas da Rainha and Lisbon.

== Life and work ==
Carlos Alexandre Rodrigues was born in Caldas da Rainha, Portugal. He graduated in Fine Arts from University of Évora and has a Master in Fine Arts, from ESAD.CR, Superior School of Arts and Design of Caldas da Rainha.

He works essentially with diverse methodologies which act on different types of media, like painting, drawing, photography and tridimensional objects — converting them into themes and a varied disciplinary fields, such as geography, architecture, urbanism, archeology, anthropology or sociology, not with the intention to treat them as such, but to summon their subjects into his artistic practice.

Carlos Alexandre Rodrigues focuses on images and found objects, in an artistic appropriation process through inventory techniques and cataloging, in a simultaneous archival and aesthetic gesture. These images serve as a catalyst or a matrix for creating new images and objects.

He is represented in Portuguese collections such as Carmona e Costa Foundation Collection (2021), Figueiredo Ribeiro Contemporary Art Collection (2015), ESAD.CR Collection - Leiria Polytechnic Institute, Caldas da Rainha (2017), Carlos Menino Drawing and Painting Collection, Caldas da Rainha (2017), and Évora University Collection in Polo dos Leões archives, Arts College, Évora (2014).

As well as exhibiting in Portugal and Spain, he's been in several artist residencies such as Dreamatorium, Salas Cinzentas, Caldas da Rainha, Electricidade Estética in 2020, Movimento das Pedras, Aldeia artística do Feital, Associação Luz Linar in 2018/19, and Resart Photo, Beirã and Marvão in 2017.

Carlos Alexandre Rodrigues is currently represented by Galeria das Salgadeiras, in Lisbon.

== Selected exhibitions ==
2022. “No, no longer, not yet”. Espaço Biblos. Fundão. Portugal.

2021. “Beyond the Shadow”. Drawing Room. Galeria das Salgadeiras. Lisbon. Portugal.

2021. “Shadows as memories”. Galeria das Salgadeiras. Lisbon. Portugal.

2021. “In Retrospect 20/21”. Ateliers abertos - Atelier 30B. Caldas da Rainha. Portugal.

2020. Drawing Room Store (online). Galeria das Salgadeiras. Lisbon. Portugal.

2020. “Viés Absoluto”. Céu de Vidro — Parque D. Carlos I. Caldas da Rainha. Portugal.

2020. “Dreamatorium”. Salas Cinzentas. Electricidade Estética. Caldas da Rainha. Portugal.

2019. SWAB Barcelona | International Art Fair. Ibirapi Contemporânea. Barcelona. Spain.

2019. “The Past is a foreign country”. Céu de Vidro — Parque D. Carlos I. Caldas da Rainha. Portugal.

2019. “A.E.GIS”. Salas Cinzentas. Electricidade Estética. Caldas da Rainha. Portugal.

2018. “No Chão e no Espaço o Firmamento”. Museu António Duarte. Caldas da Rainha. Portugal.

2018. “Natura Sapiens”. Ibirapi Contemporânea. Lisbon. Portugal.

2018. “Caleidoscópio”. Maus Hábitos. Porto. Portugal.

2018. “Incerta Desambiguação”. Galeria Zaratan. Lisbon. Portugal.

2017. “Lumen”. CAT- Centro de Artes de Tavira. Tavira. Portugal.

2017. “Emergências - Ilha dos Amores”. Espaço Pontes / Museu Etnográfico do Fundão. Fundão. Portugal.

2017. Mostra’17. Lisbon. Portugal.

== Awards ==
2011. Pedro Portugal Post-contemporary Art Award.

== Other projects ==
- Panaceia Project (2014) - Exhibition: Estranhai o que não parece estranho, Susana Gaudêncio, Centro de Artes de Caldas da Rainha. Conversa: Susana Gaudêncio e Maria do Mar Fazenda.
- Noites da Lua Azul Cycle – São Sebastião Chapel. Caderno de Campo I. Exhibition: Nunca peregrino algum visitou os santos lugares com mais devoção do que os lugares que me viram nascer, Carlos Menino."
