= Peniche =

Peniche may refer to:

== Places ==
- Peniche, Portugal
  - Peniche Fortress
  - Friend from Peniche

== People ==
- Count of Peniche, a Portuguese title
- Arturo Peniche (born 1962), Mexican actor
- Kari Ann Peniche (born 1984), American actress
- Karla Peniche (born 1988), Mexican model, TV actress and beauty pageant
- Peniche Everton Romualdo (born 1979), Brazilian footballer
- Yuliana Peniche (born 1981), Mexican actress

== Other ==
- Peniche (fluid dynamics), material inserted between a half-model and the wall of a wind tunnel, used to reduce the effect of the boundary layer
- Péniche (barge), a French barge. Associated with the Freycinet gauge for locks in France
- G.D. Peniche, Portuguese football team

== See also ==
- Péniche Hôtel, a type of floating hotel on a peniche
- Péniche Opéra, a French opera company based on a peniche
