= University of Leiria and Oeste =

Public university centered in Leiria, Portugal

- Universidade de Leiria e Oeste
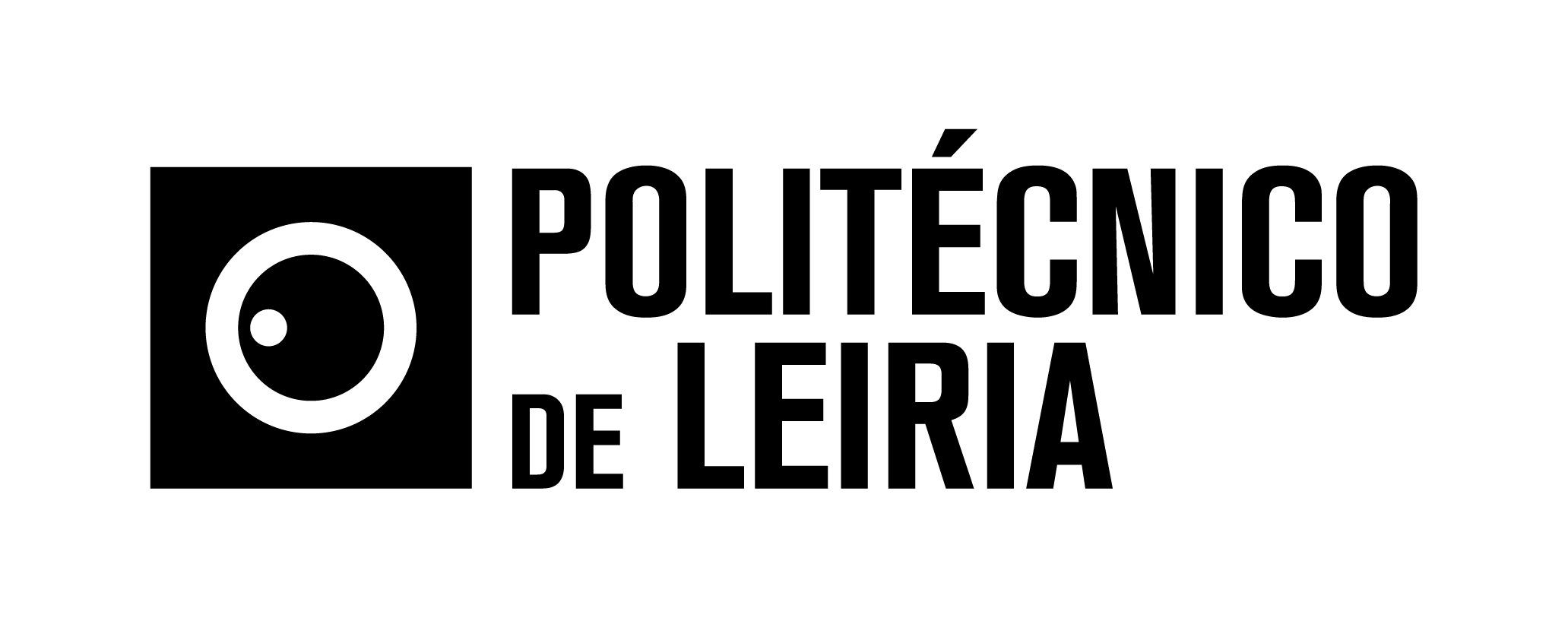
- Logo as the Polytechnic Institute of Leiria
- Type: Public university, Portugal
- Established: 16 August 1980, as Polytechnic Institute of Leiria; 20 April 1987 (Initial activity); 24 July 2026, as University of Leiria and Oeste
- Rector: Carlos Rabadão
- Administrative staff: 866 academic / 297 non-academic (2014)
- Students: 14,500
- Location: Leiria, Caldas da Rainha, Peniche, Portugal
- Campus: several locations, Leiria
- Language: Portuguese, English
- Colours: Black and Crimson (university); Light blue (education and social sciences); Light green (technology and management); Orange (arts and design); Cerulean blue (tourism and maritime technology); Green (health)
- Website: https://www.ulo.pt/en/

The University of Leiria and Oeste (ULO; Portuguese: Universidade de Leiria e Oeste) is a Portuguese public university based in Leiria, Portugal, established through the transformation of the Polytechnic Institute of Leiria (IPL) in July 2026.

Originally meant to serve the city as well as the district of Leiria as a whole, the university is nowadays present across the entirety of both the Leiria and Oeste regions through its campuses in Leiria, Caldas da Rainha and Peniche as well as its training centres, where it offers undergraduate, master's, doctoral, postgraduate and professional higher technical programmes in a wide range of fields, including arts and design, education, communication, engineering, technology, health sciences and tourism.

== History ==
The Polytechnic Institute of Leiria was officially founded on the 16 August 1980 as by a government decree. Like many of the other regional polytechnics in the country, this had come as a consequence of state reforms in 1973 - since dubbed the "Veiga Simão ([pt]) Reforms" - which had restructured the higher education system in Portugal and had created this type of institution within the legal framework. Indeed, it would be in this period that the original nursing school of Leiria (Escola Superior de Enfermagem de Leiria) would be created. However, with the Carnation Revolution for the following year, it would take until the end of the decade for the state to revisit the concept of regional higher education at a larger scale. After framework remodeling between 1977 and 1980, the city of Leiria would now have two new bodies at this level of learning - the Instituto Politécnico and the Leiria Superior School of Education (ESE, Escola Superior de Educação [de Leiria]), a few months prior.

The creation of the "IPL" would take time to move from paper into reality, however, as only on 20 April 1987 would it begin its activities with the initial undertakings of its founding committee, with the existing ESE becoming the first school to be integrated into the new polytechnic. In July, the school would expand with the establishment of a second campus in Caldas da Rainha and would be joined the following year by the institute's arts school, which opened as the School of Art and Design (ESAD, Escola Superior de Arte e Design). The organization would expand twice more shortly after, first with the creation of the School of Technology and Management (ESTG) in the Convent of Saint Stephen (Convento de Santo Estêvão) ahead of 1989/90 and second in 1991 through the School of Maritime Technology (ESTM, Escola de Tecnologia Marítima) in Peniche.

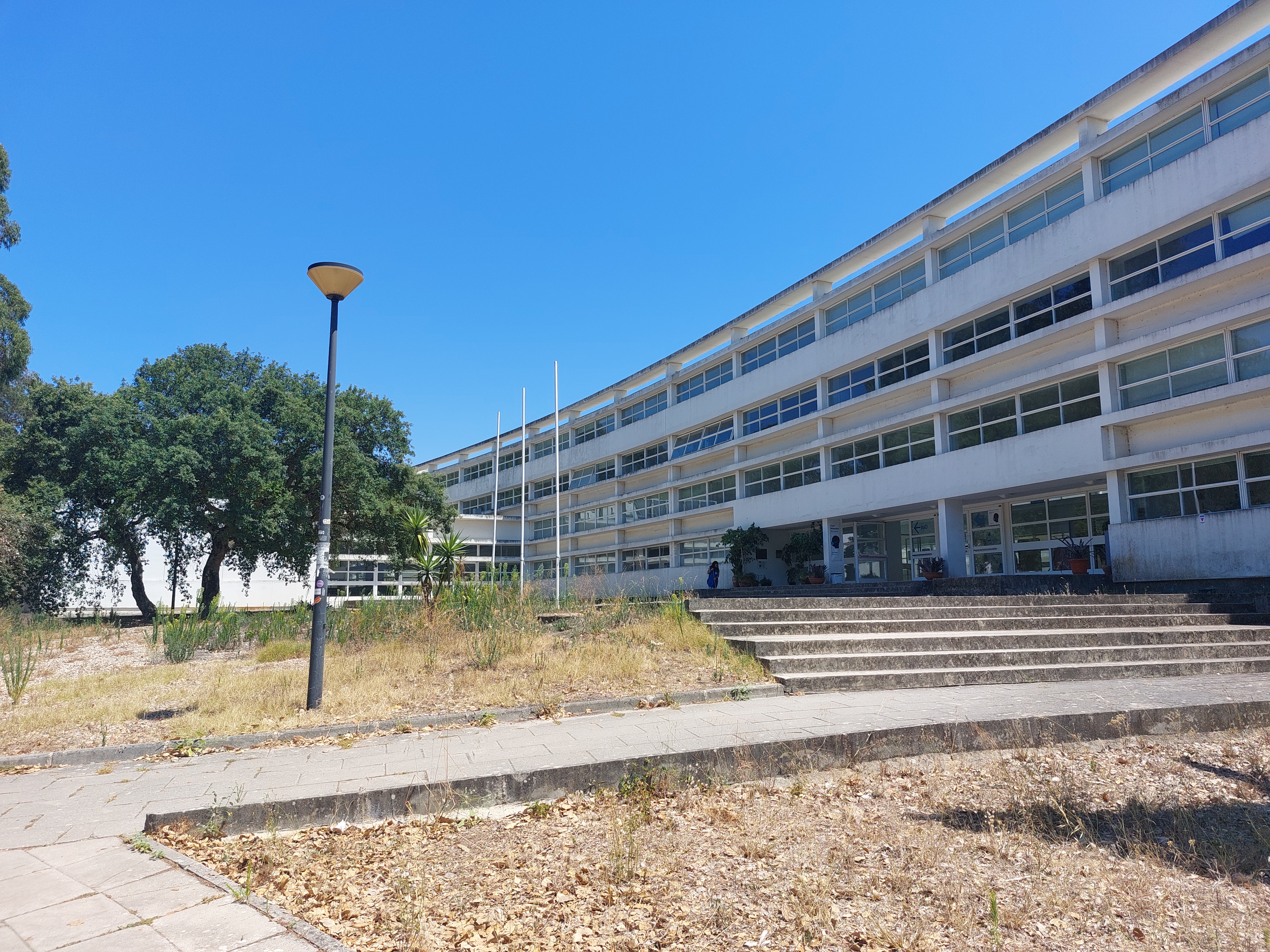
The main building of the ESAD campus in Caldas da Rainha, which opened in 1987

During the late 1990s, the transition period for the Polytechnic of Leiria and its then four schools would end. In August 1995, the Institute published its statutes, which would lead to its first elected in president the following February. Around this time, in 1995/96, the first piece of the Morro do Lena campus (otherwise nowadays known as Leiria-2) would be opened, signalling the departure of the ESTG from Santo Estêvão. The turn of the new millennium would continue this modernization of infrastructure, with the announcement of their new headquarters in 2000 designed by Rui Livramento. At the same time, the institute also looked to expand ambitiously within its territory and scope, celebrating protocols with the municipality of Pombal for the creation of a training centre and the municipality of Alcobaça for a "School of Health Technology" - while the former would be inaugurated only in October 2021, the latter would never proceed. Despite this, IPL would get its medical technology school in 2001, when the Escola Superior de Enfermagem entered into its fold, and would later receive its current name (ESSLei) in 2005. In September 2006, the Polytechnic changed its brand identity to a modern design by Foote, Cone and Belding, which, based a circle with a singular dot within its left side, centre, was meant to convey an eye, a compass pointing West (a direction - and region - increasingly prominent in the institution) and inclusivity.

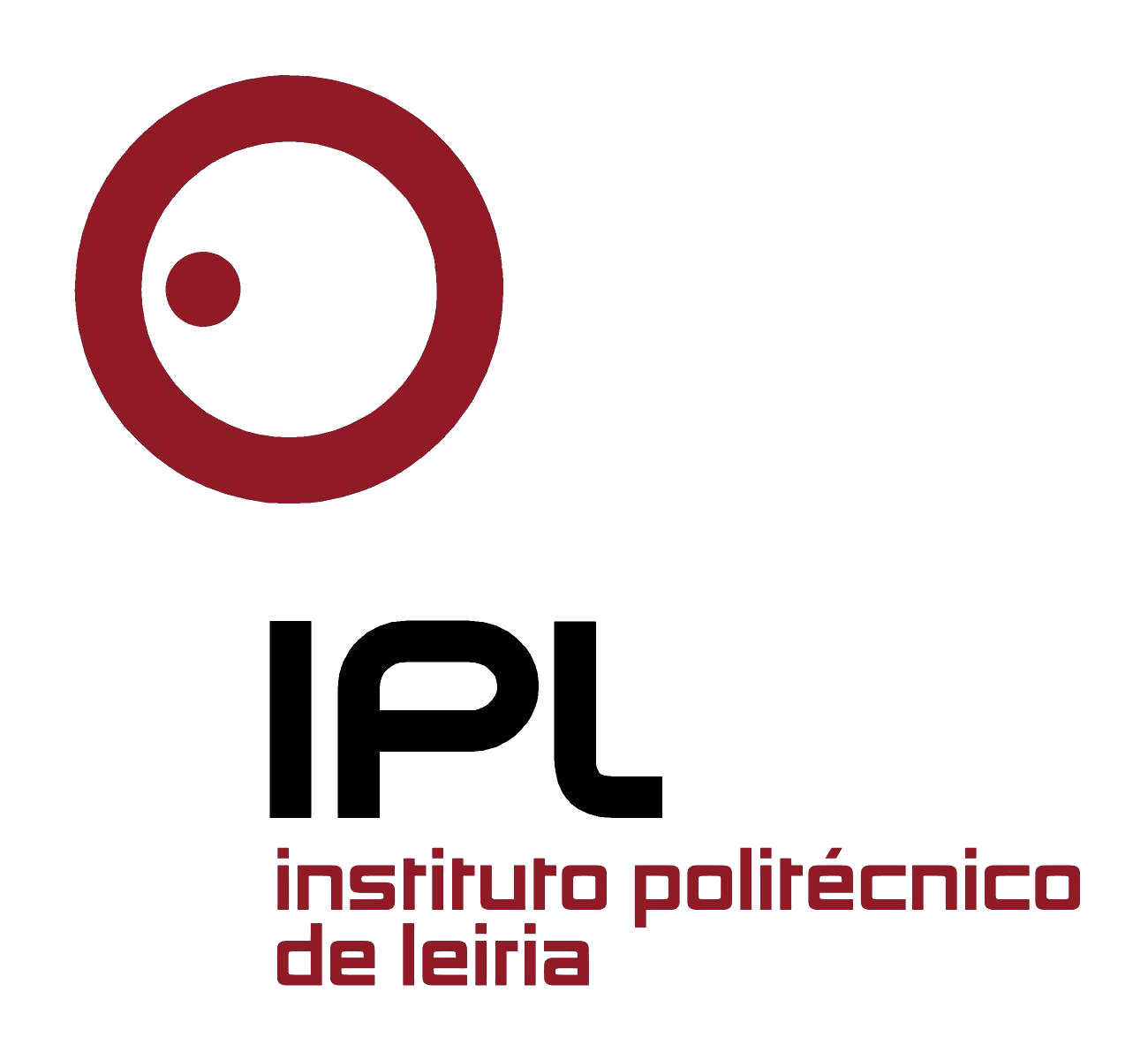
The logo between 2006 and 2014 in which the "eye" concept was introduced

In 2017, the IPL expanded southward beyond its old district borders into Torres Vedras, where a second training centre was inaugurated. The most populous municipality of the Oeste region would go on to celebrate a second agreement in 2020, in which a new health school would be placed in the eastern end of the city. However, upon the confirmation deadline in 2026 ahead of 2027/28, it would be revoked by the municipality because of disagreements on what would be taught at the new campus, with a demand of a nursing course by the city, which according to the institution president Carlos Rabadão "was never on the table" for that project.

In the 2023/24 it began branding itself as a "Polytechnic University" although at this point its status had not changed and would later submit a request for conversion into a university. The transition would officially be published on the 9 July 2026 and come into effect a few days later on the 24 July.

== Organization ==
=== Schools and institutions ===
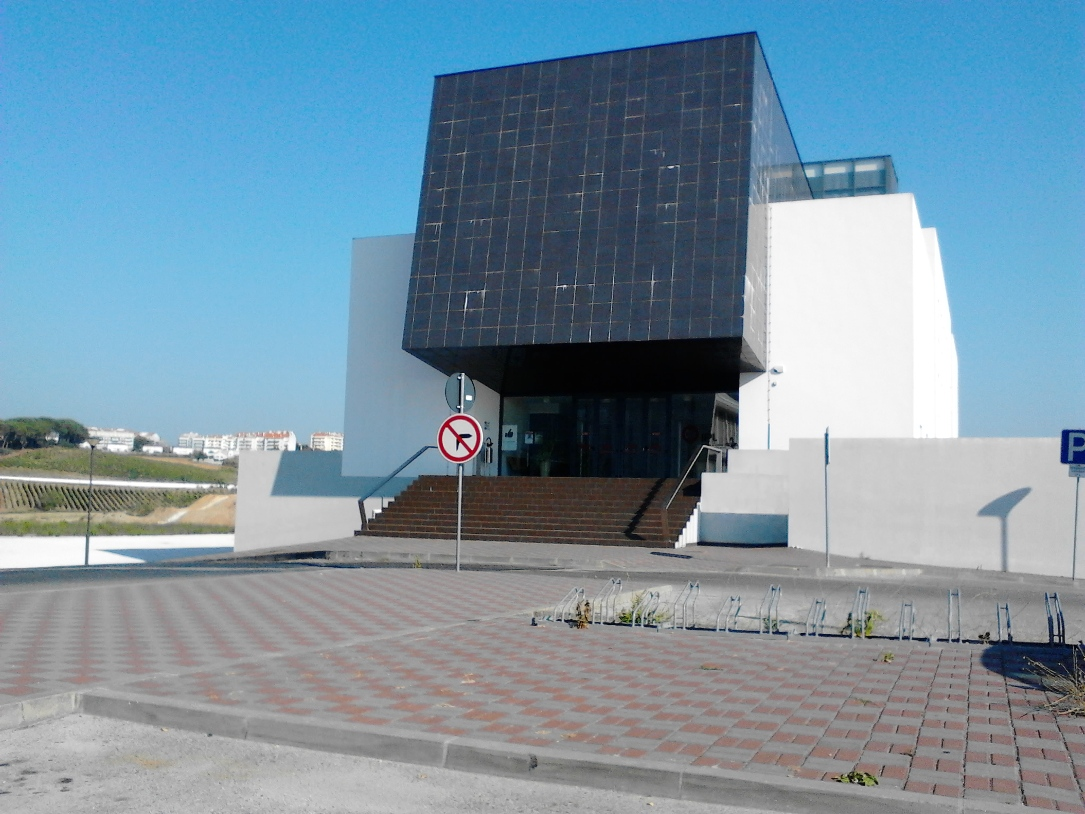
The School of Health within the "Morro do Lena" Leiria-2 Campus

The University of Leiria and Oeste is currently composed of five schools, three of which have the centre in Leiria:

- School of Art and Design (ESAD.CR)
- School of Education and Social Sciences (ESECS)
- School of Health Sciences (ESSLei)
- School of Technology and Management (ESTL)
- School of Tourism and Maritime Technology (ESTM)

Additionally, the university includes two training centres (centros de formação) for vocational formation in Pombal and Torres Vedras. Furthermore, it has one investigation unit, the Centre for Rapid and Sustained Product Development (CDRSP), based out of Marinha Grande.

=== Campuses ===
Locations of Leiria and other ULO campi (black) and centres (green)

The university is currently split across five campuses, aside from its administrative headquarters. In 2021 the university was awarded the bronze certification International University Sports Federation Healthy Campus certification.

Headquarters (Leiria) - The ULO's rectory and services are located on Rua General Norton de Matos, next to Quinta de São Bartolomeu. Although not connected, it is in the same overall city block as the institution's first campus.

Campus 1 (Leiria) - the first of the Leiria campi, it houses the School of Education and Social Sciences (ESECS) which succeeded the original ESE. It develops its training activity in the areas of Human and Social Sciences, Communication and Teacher Training. It has an enrollment of approximately 1,700 students.

Campus 2 (Leiria) - known as the "Morro do Lena" campus, it consists of two schools: the School of Technology and Management (ESTG) and the School Of Health Sciences (ESSLei).

The ESTG offers courses in the areas of engineering and technology and of entrepreneurial and juridical sciences. It is a school recognized for the quality of the education provided and for its strong connection to the enterprise world, not only from the Leiria and West region but also on a national level. The school is attended by approximately 5.600 students. The School Of Health Sciences (ESSLei) was integrated in ULO in 2001 and has been intended for the training of nurses and it is predicted that in the next academic year it will widen its training offer to other areas of Health Sciences. It is attended by approximately 800 students.

Campus 3 (Caldas da Rainha) - Campus 3 of ULO is situated in Caldas da Rainha, approximately 60 kilometers South of Leiria. The School of Fine Arts and Design (ESAD.CR) is located in this city.

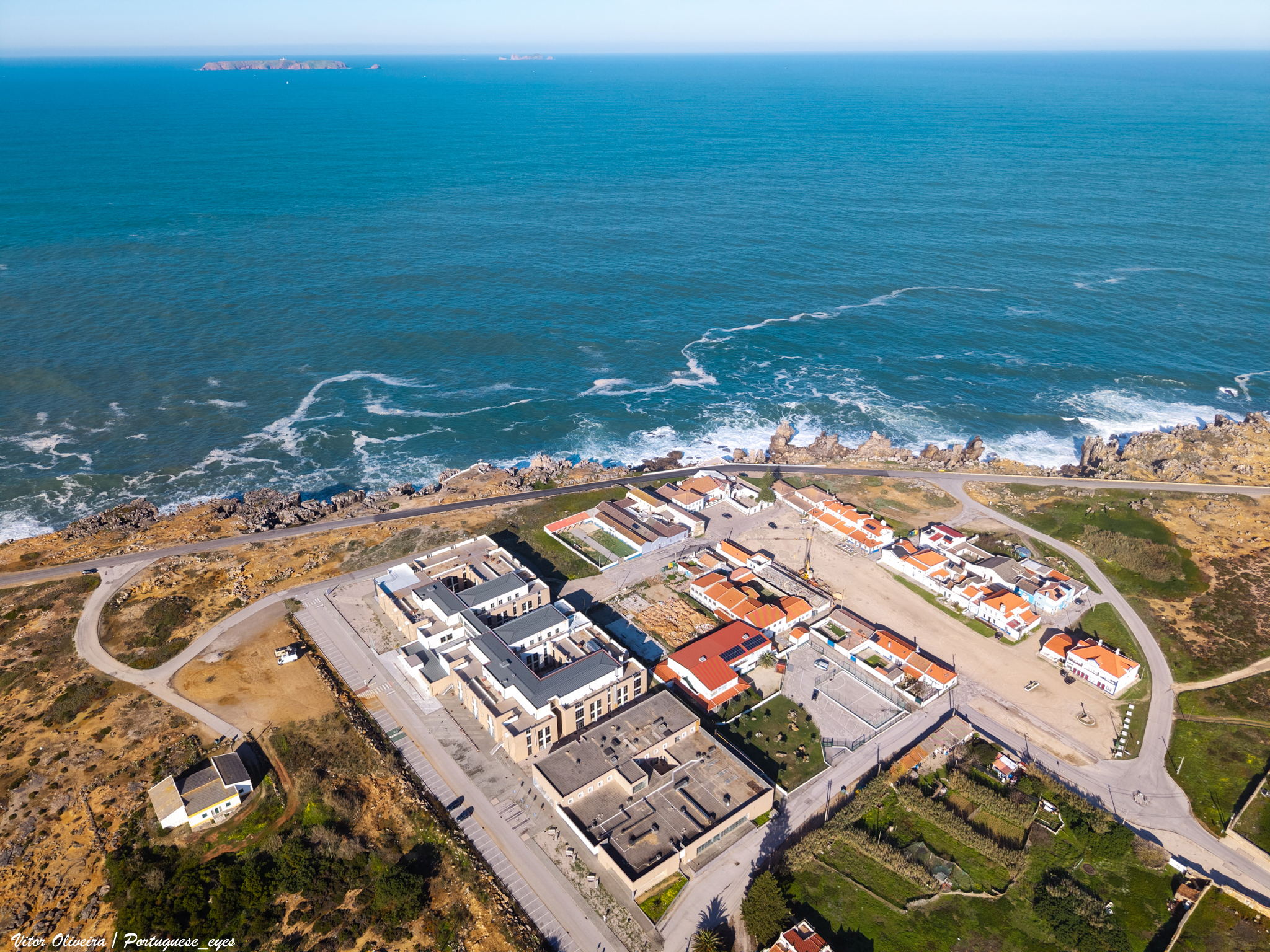
The ETSM campus in Peniche

Campus 4 (Peniche) - The School of Maritime Technology (ESTM) is located in ULO's Campus 4, in Peniche (80 kilometers South of Leiria). This school with 1.500 students is especially aimed at the training in the area of Tourism, Marine Biology, Biotechnology and Food Engineering.

Campus 5 (Leiria) - In Campus 5, in Leiria, there are other structures of the Institute: the Institute for Research, Development and Advanced Studies (INDEA), the Training Centre for the Courses of Technology Specialization (FOR.CET) with around 900 students, the Centre of New Opportunities (CNO), a Transfer Technology and Information Center (OTIC) and an E-Learning Unit (UED). These are units with specific aims that encompass the investigation and post-graduate training, the post-secondary training, the e-learning, the knowledge transfer, among others.

== Undergraduate Degrees ==
Fine Arts and Design

Fine Arts (School of Fine Arts and design), Caldas da Rainha

Interior and Spatial Design (School of Fine Arts and design), Caldas da Rainha

Design - Ceramics and Glass (School of Fine Arts and design), Caldas da Rainha

Design - Graphics and Multimedia (School of Fine Arts and design), Caldas da Rainha

Industrial Design (School of Fine Arts and design), Caldas da Rainha

Sound and Image (School of Fine Arts and design), Caldas da Rainha

Theatre (School of Fine Arts and design), Caldas da Rainha

Entrepreneurial and Juridical Sciences

Public Administration (School of Technology and Management), Leiria

Accountancy and Finance(School of Technology and Management), Leiria

Management (School of Technology and Management), Leiria

Marketing (School of Technology and Management), LeiriaHuman Relations and Organisational Communication ( School of Education and

Social Sciences), Leiria

Law Studies (Legal Counselling) (School of Technology and Management), Leiria

Education and Social Sciences

Media and Multimedia Education (School of Education and Social Sciences), Leiria

Primary Education (School of Education and Social Sciences), Leiria

Social Education (School of Education and Social Sciences), Leiria

Social Work (School of Education and Social Sciences), Leiria

Translation and Interpretation Portuguese/Chinese - Chinese/Portuguese (School of Education and Social Sciences), Leiria

Engineering and Technology

Biotechnology and Marine Biology (School of Tourism and Maritime Technology), Peniche

Biomechanics (School of Technology and Management), Leiria

Energy and Environment (School of Technology and Management), Leiria

Food Engineering (School of Tourism and Maritime Technology), Peniche

Automotive Engineering (School of Technology and Management), Leiria

Civil Engineering (School of Technology and Management), Leiria

Electrical and Electronics Engineering (School of Technology and Management), Leiria

Computer Engineering (School of Technology and Management), Leiria

Mechanical Engineering (School of Technology and Management), Leiria

Marine Resource Management* (School of Tourism and Maritime Technology), Peniche

Health Informatics (School of Technology and Management), Leiria

Civil Protection (School of Technology and Management), Leiria

Health Equipment Technology (School of Technology and Management), Leiria

Videogames and Multimedia Technology* (School of Technology and Management), Leiria

Health

Sports and Well-Being (School of Education and Social Sciences), Leiria

Dietetics* (School of Health Sciences), Leiria

Nursing (School of Health Sciences), Leiria

Nursing - Beginning in the 2nd Semestre (School of Health Sciences), Leiria

Physiotherapy (School of Health Sciences), Leiria

Speech Therapy(School of Health Sciences), Leiria

Occupational Therapy (School of Health Sciences), Leiria

Tourism

Cultural Animation (School of Education and Social Sciences), Leiria

Tourism and Recreation (School of Tourism and Maritime Technology), Peniche

Leisure Management and Business Tourism (School of Tourism and Maritime Technology), Peniche

Tourism and Hotel Management (School of Tourism and Maritime Technology), Peniche

Maritime Resources Management* (School of Tourism and Maritime Technology), Peniche

Marketing for Tourism (School of Tourism and Maritime Technology), Peniche

Restaurant Industry and Catering (School of Tourism and Maritime Technology), Peniche

Tourism (School of Tourism and Maritime Technology), Peniche

== Master Degrees ==
Art and Design

Fine Arts

Typography Design

Product Design

Cultural Management

Theatre

Entrepreneurial and Juridical Sciences

Business Finance

International Business

Alternative

Law Studies

Education and Communication

Speech Pathology

Pre-School Education

Pre-School Education and Primary Education

Basic Education – 1st Cycle

Basic Education – 1st and 2nd Cycle

Teaching of English and French in the Basic Education

Engineering and Technology

Aquaculture

Biotechnology of Marine Resources

Computer Engineering - Mobile Computing

Conception and Development of Products

Civil Constructions

Energy and Environment

Automotive Engineering

Automation Systems

Technology and Multimedia Communication

Telecommunication

Health

Intervention for an Active Aging

== R&D Units ==
Identiti(es) and Diversiti(es) Research Centre (CIID)

Centre for Rapid and Sustainable Product Development (CDRsp)

globADVANTAGE - Centre of Research on International Business & Strategy

Maritime Resources Research Group (GIRM)

Education's Investigation and Development Branch (NIDE)

Arts and Theatre Investigation Group (GIAE/C)

Sustainability Management Centre of Investigation (CIGS)

Tourism Investigation Group (GITUR)

Communications and Computer Science Research Centre (CIIC)

Human Motoricity Centre of Investigation – CIMH

Policies and Educational Systems Centre of Investigation – CIPSE

Institute for Systems and Computing Engineering

Institute of Telecommunications – Leiria branch
