= Ferrel (Peniche) =

- Civil parish
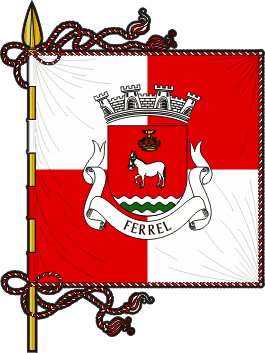
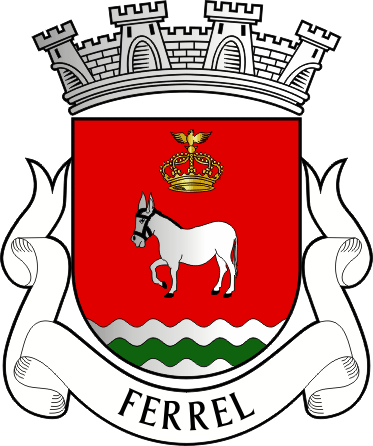
- Flag Coat of arms

- Location in Portugal
- Coordinates: 39.365°N 9.316°W
- Country: Portugal
- Region: Oeste e Vale do Tejo
- Intermunic. comm.: Oeste
- District: Leiria
- Municipality: Peniche

Area
  - Total: 13.79 km^{2} (5.32 sq mi)

Population (2011)
  - Total: 2,649
  - Density: 190/km^{2} (500/sq mi)
- Time zone: UTC+00:00 (WET)
  - Summer (DST): UTC+01:00 (WEST)
- Postal code: 2520
- Patron: Nossa Senhora da Guia
- Website: www.freguesiadeferrel.pt

Ferrel is a seaside parish in Peniche, Portugal. The population in 2011 was 2,649, in an area of 13.79 km^{2}.

== Sport and recreation ==
It has beaches and breaks facing in 3 distinctly different directions making it a very variable and consistent destination for surfers. Home to many surf camps/schools and recently the destination for the WCT of the ASP (World championship tour of Association of Surfing Professionals) in time for the autumn swells.

== Location ==
The Parish of ferrel occupies a space of 13.79 square km, facing north with the Atlantic Ocean, south with the parish of Atouguia da Baleia, east with the municipality of Óbidos and west with the parish of Peniche The Parish of Ferrel is composed of the following lands: Ferrel, Baleal and Baleal Sol Village I, II, Casais do Baleal and Casal da Lagoa Seca.It is located 5 km from Peniche (municipality), 74.20 km from Lisbon ( Capital) and Leiria at 65.99 km.

== Demographics ==
=== Population ===
Historically, the population of Ferrel was larger, but over the centuries it has been losing population. At the end of the 1950s, Ferrel was a very poor village and the poorest in the municipality of Peniche. The means of subsistence at that time were sparse.

At that time, the main activity was agriculture (still is today), in which the sandy soils were therefore not very productive; On the other hand, the parcels of land that were brought up were small, with no characteristics or means for extensive and intensive agriculture that would provide sufficient income.

=== Emigration ===
At the beginning of the 1960s, it began in force, for countries like France, Canada, Luxembourg, the United Kingdom, among others ... The Ferralejos / Portuguese to leave Portugal, had to go underground, in other words, to cross the land border with Spain, because the then government headed by António de Oliveira Salazar, did not allow any Portuguese to leave without being the head of the family and voided visas to make it difficult to leave the country. Upon arriving at the border with Spain, they met with so-called "smugglers" who, in exchange for money, helped them to cross the border without being seen by the Spanish guards, after having reached their destination, confirmed by telephone that they had already arrived, also that they already had jobs, after that, hundreds of Portuguese went abroad.

They return during the Christmas period and during the Ferrel Festivities.
