= Serra d'El-Rei =

- Civil parish
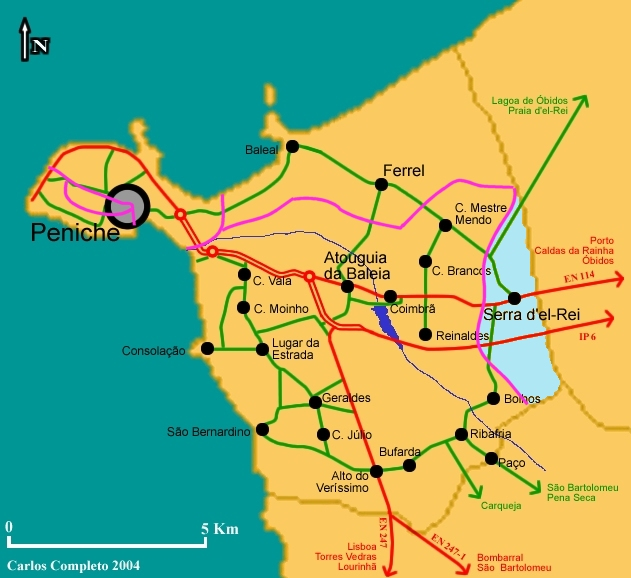
- Coordinates: 39.331°N 9.270°W
- Country: Portugal
- Region: Oeste e Vale do Tejo
- Intermunic. comm.: Oeste
- District: Leiria
- Municipality: Peniche

Area
  - Total: 8.92 km^{2} (3.44 sq mi)

Population (2011)
  - Total: 1,401
  - Density: 157/km^{2} (407/sq mi)
- Time zone: UTC+00:00 (WET)
  - Summer (DST): UTC+01:00 (WEST)
- Website: www.jfserradelrei.com

Serra d'El-Rei ('Mountains of the King') is a Portuguese parish in the municipality of Peniche on the Atlantic Coast. The population in 2011 was 1,401, in an area of 8.92 km². Serra d'El-Rei became a town on July 1, 2003.

It was at Serra d'El-Rei that King Peter I of Portugal lived with his lover Inês de Castro. His 14th-century castle in the town is now divided into three private living houses today.

Serra d'El-Rei is 7 km (4.3 mi) west of the historic walled-town of Óbidos, and 10 km east from Peniche.

== Gallery ==
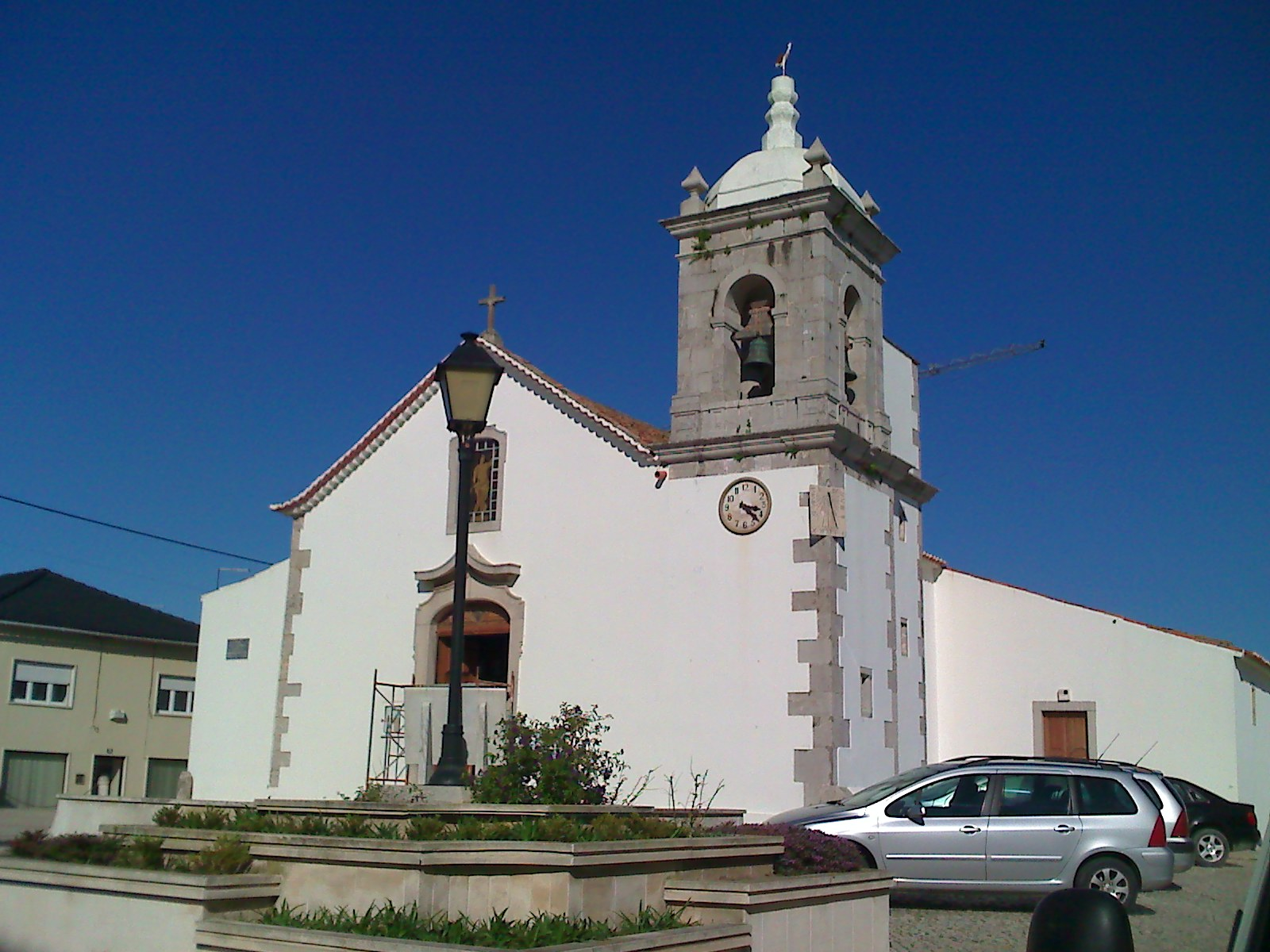
The 17th century Catholic church in the town square

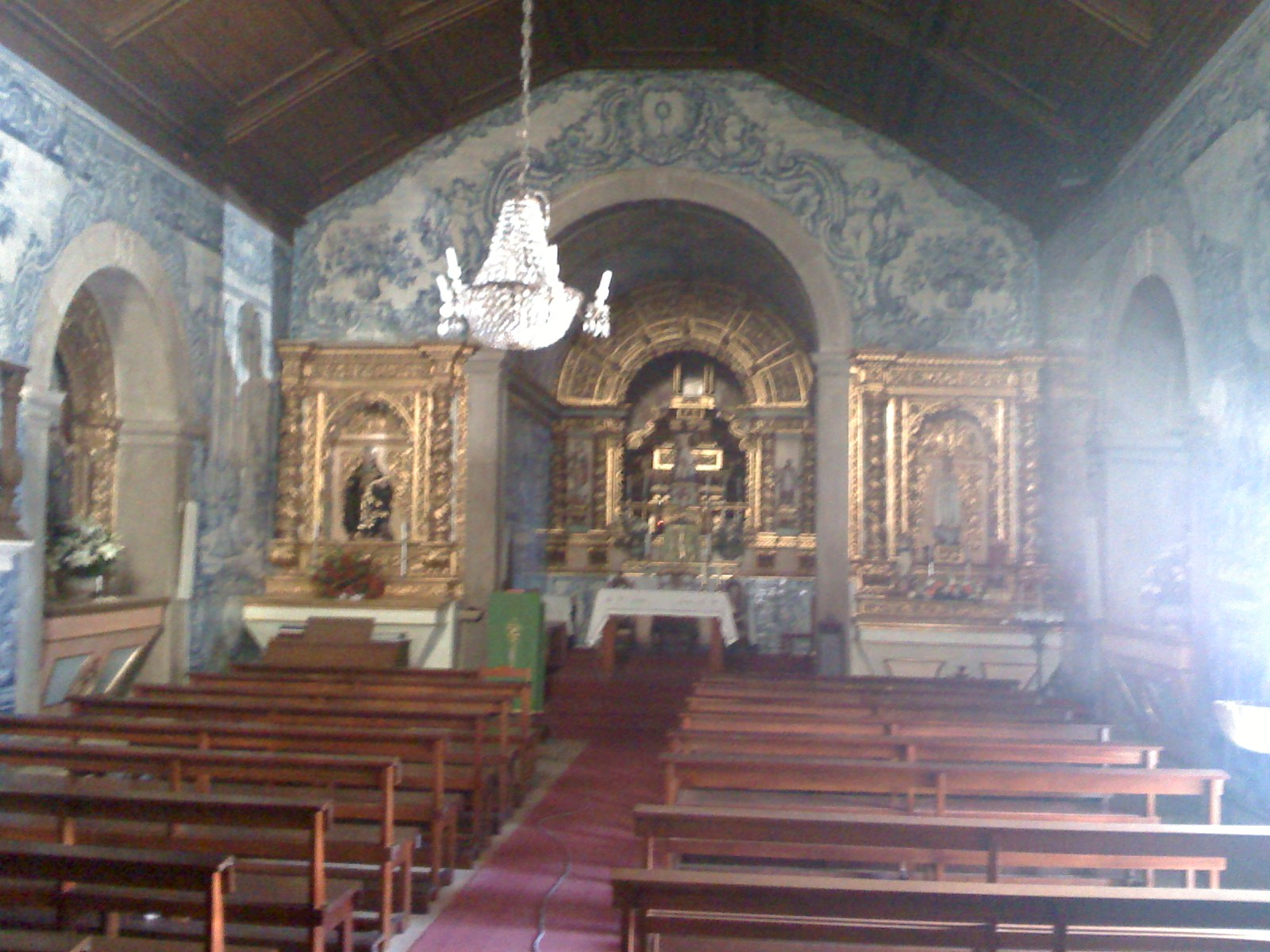
Interior of the church showing typical hand-painted blue and white tiles with Biblical scenes
