= Friend from Peniche =

Idiomatic expression from Portugal

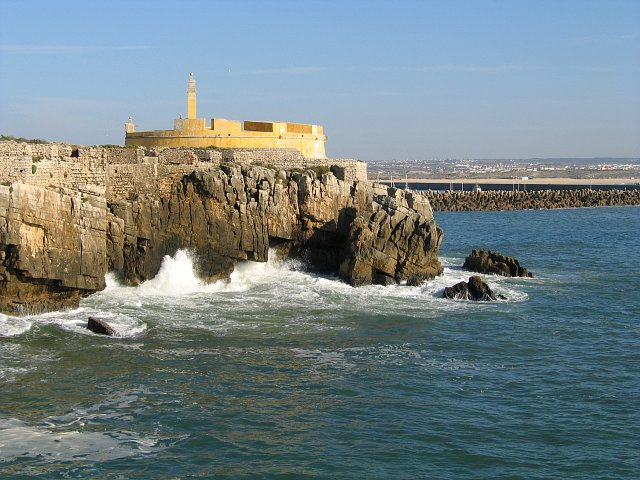
The Peniche Fortress in 2005.

Friend from Peniche (Portuguese: Amigo de Peniche) is an idiomatic expression from Portugal that refers to a disloyal friend who is not to be trusted and is only interested in receiving at the expense of others without offering anything in return.

== History ==
The expression originated in the context of the Drake-Norris Expedition, also known as the Counter Armada, English Armada, or the Portugal Expedition.

On 26 May 1589, a force of 6500 English soldiers landed on Consolação beach, near Peniche, under the command of Robert Devereux. He was part of a military expedition of 140 ships and 27,600 men (or 20,000 men and 170 ships) under the command of Francis Drake and Admiral John Norris, with orders from Elizabeth I to put King António back on the throne of Portugal and restore Portuguese sovereignty. Simultaneously with the legitimacy of respecting the Anglo-Portuguese Alliance, Isabel I wanted to hinder Spanish efforts to rebuild their naval power after the defeat of the Spanish Armada, and prevent a new attempt by Spain to invade England.

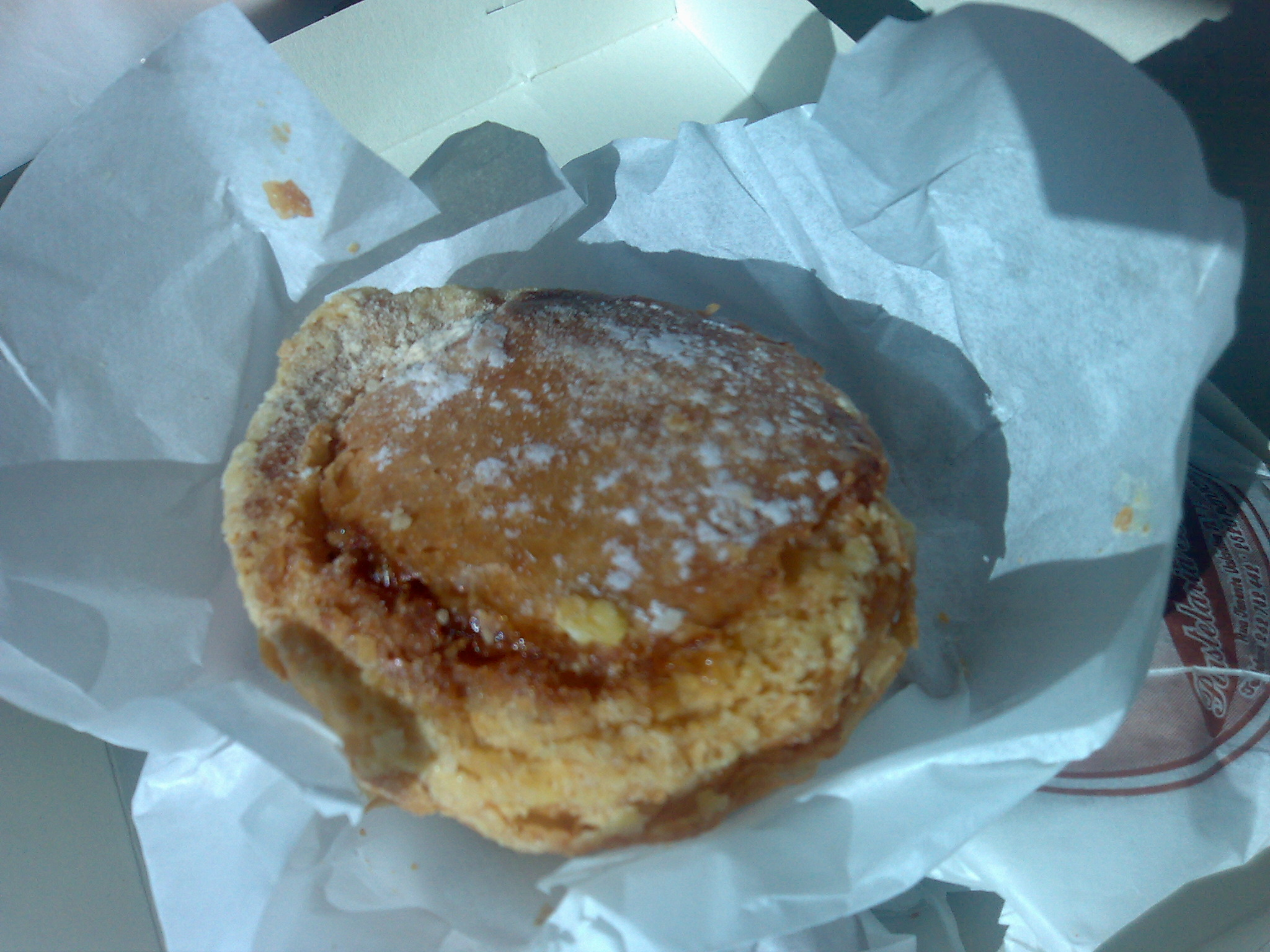
An Amigo de Peniche, a traditional pastel from Peniche, whose name was inspired by this idiomatic expression.

The military action began successfully: the Peniche Fortress fell to Essex's men and the Portuguese garrison, under Spanish command, did not put up much resistance. While the troops that landed headed overland to Lisbon, the rest of the fleet, under the command of Francis Drake, headed for Cascais. The objectives of the invasion were to surround Lisbon by land and sea, and to occupy the Azores in order to cut off the Spanish silver route.

The word got around among the Portuguese: "Here come our friends, who have landed in Peniche...", but on the way to Lisbon the English forces earned Portuguese distrust by sacking Atouguia da Baleia, Lourinhã, Torres Vedras and Loures.

At the gates of the capital, the land forces were initially stationed at Monte Olivete (now the freguesia of São Mamede) but moved on to Boa Vista, Bairro Alto and then Esperança, when D. Gabriel Niño opened fire with the cannons of the Castle of São Jorge. The artillery promised by Isabel I to King António had not traveled on the expedition, which limited the British's ability to respond.

What the English didn't expect was that the Duke of Bragança, Teodósio II, as the great political rival of King António and as Constable of Portugal, realizing that the advancing forces didn't have the support they needed to win, turned in favour of the Castilians. It was for this reason that, at the head of an army of 6,000 Portuguese men, he reinforced Lisbon's defenses.

In Cascais, Francis Drake was waiting for land to enter Lisbon in order to surround the city on the River Tagus; but John Norris' men were ineffective in attacking the well-fortified and better-defended capital, where the Spanish had reinforced the garrison and repression. In the meantime, the patriots inside the walls who were ready to fight and knew about the British landing were asking themselves: "What's wrong with our friends who landed in Peniche? When will our friends from Peniche arrive?".

The Portuguese commitment to military action also failed. In order to win England's military support, King António had used the argument that the Portuguese populations would rise up on his side against the Spanish, so that it might not even be necessary to fight. But the occupation was based on fierce repression, reinforced by the threat of invasion, and the popular uprising didn't happen.

Less than a month after the landing, the English expedition returned to the fleet anchored in Cascais, leaving the Portuguese supporters of the Prior of Crato wondering what had become of those "friends of Peniche". More attacked by the plague than in combat, the English had suffered significant damage without achieving any of their objectives. Since then, the expression "friends of Peniche" has come to designate all false friends.

== Cultural impact ==
Due to the negative image that Penicheans carry because of the expression, the Peniche City Council publicized and staged a reenactment of the historical version of the events, with the aim of repelling the anathema and "identifying the authentic friends of Peniche." The reenactment took place in the Peniche Fortress on May 27, 2006.

== Bibliography ==
- CALADO, Mariano. Peniche na História e na Lenda. Torres Vedras, Gráf. Torriana, 1962.
