= Peniche, Portugal =

Peniche
- Municipality
- City of Peniche
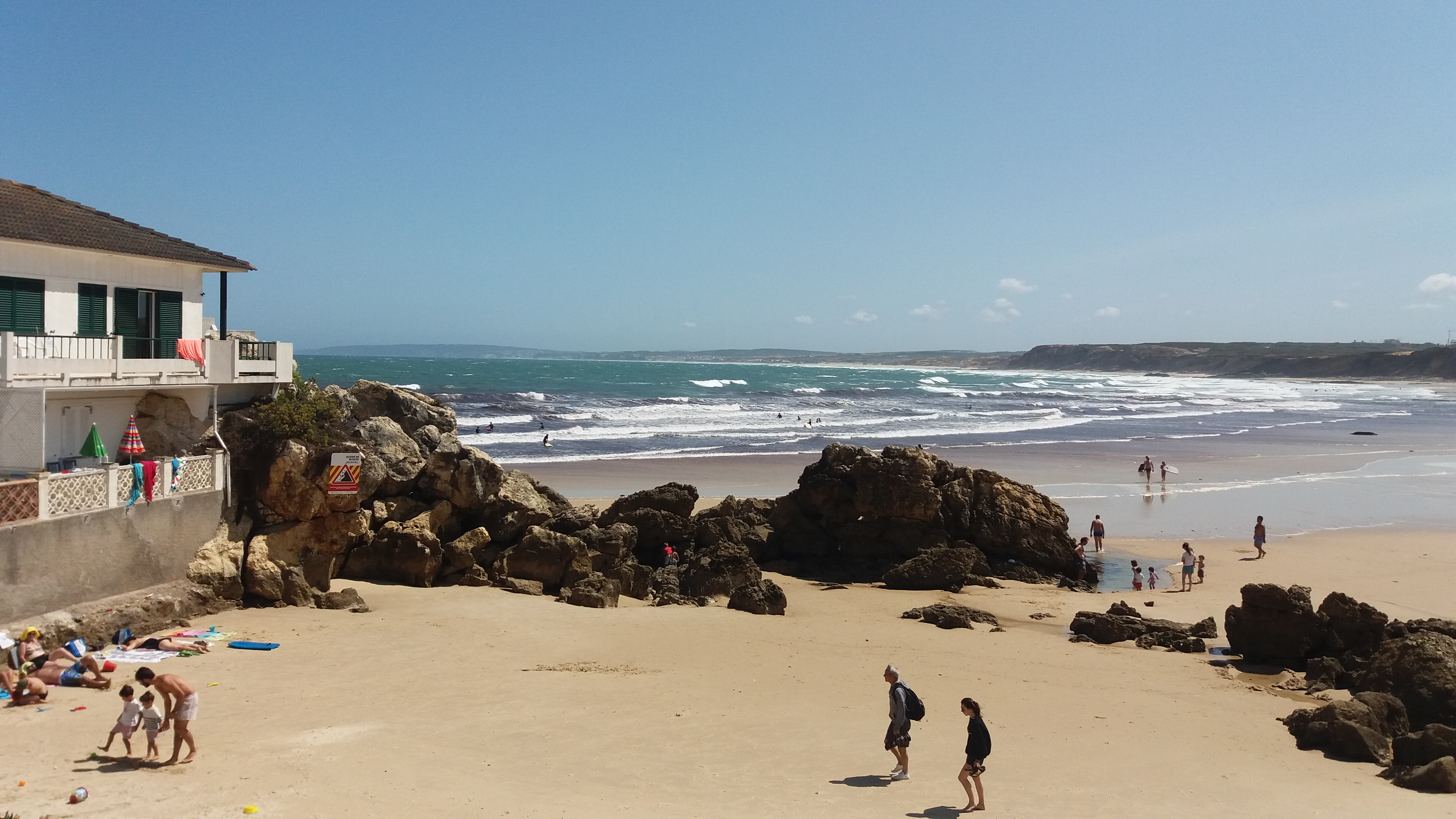
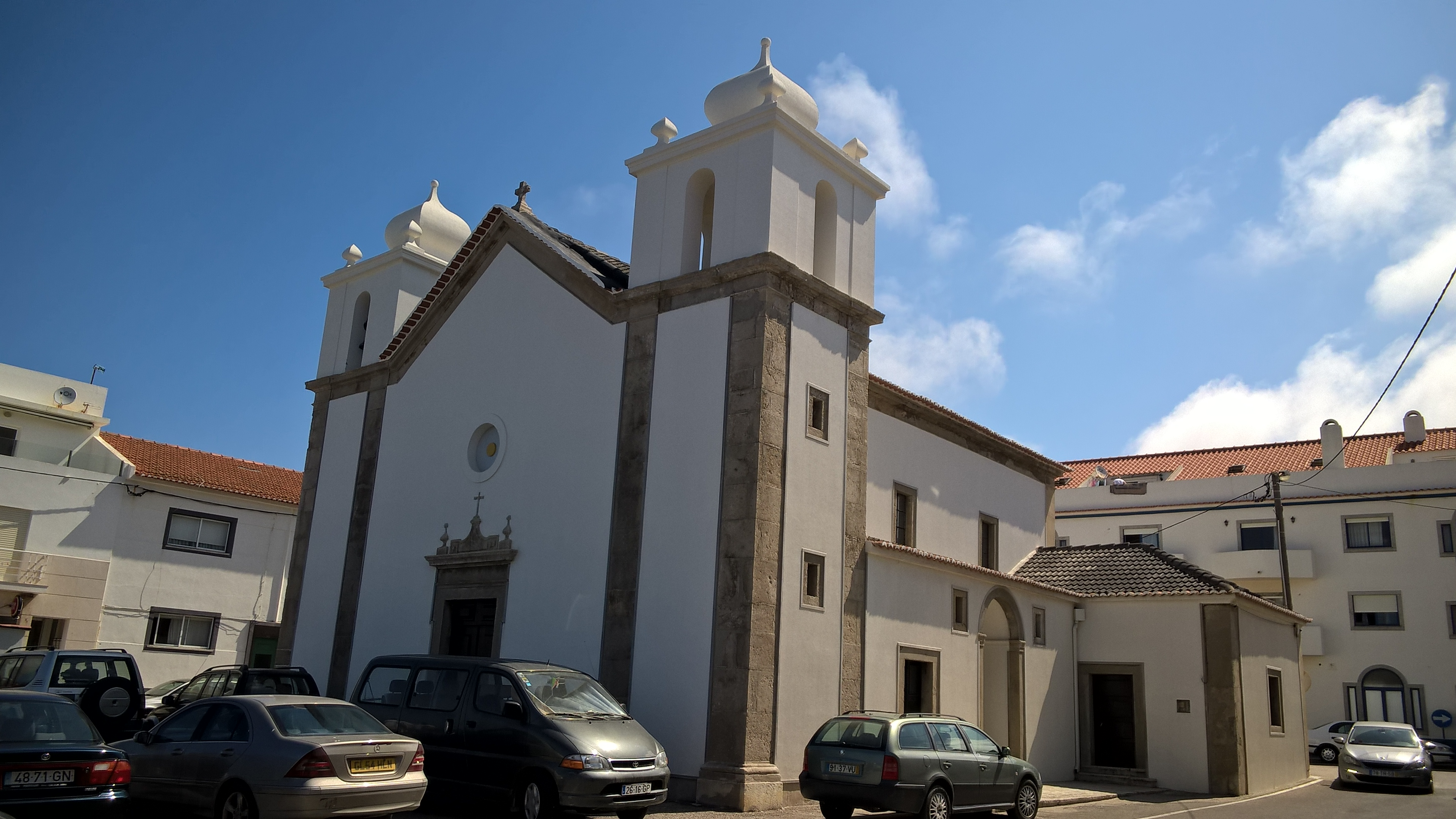
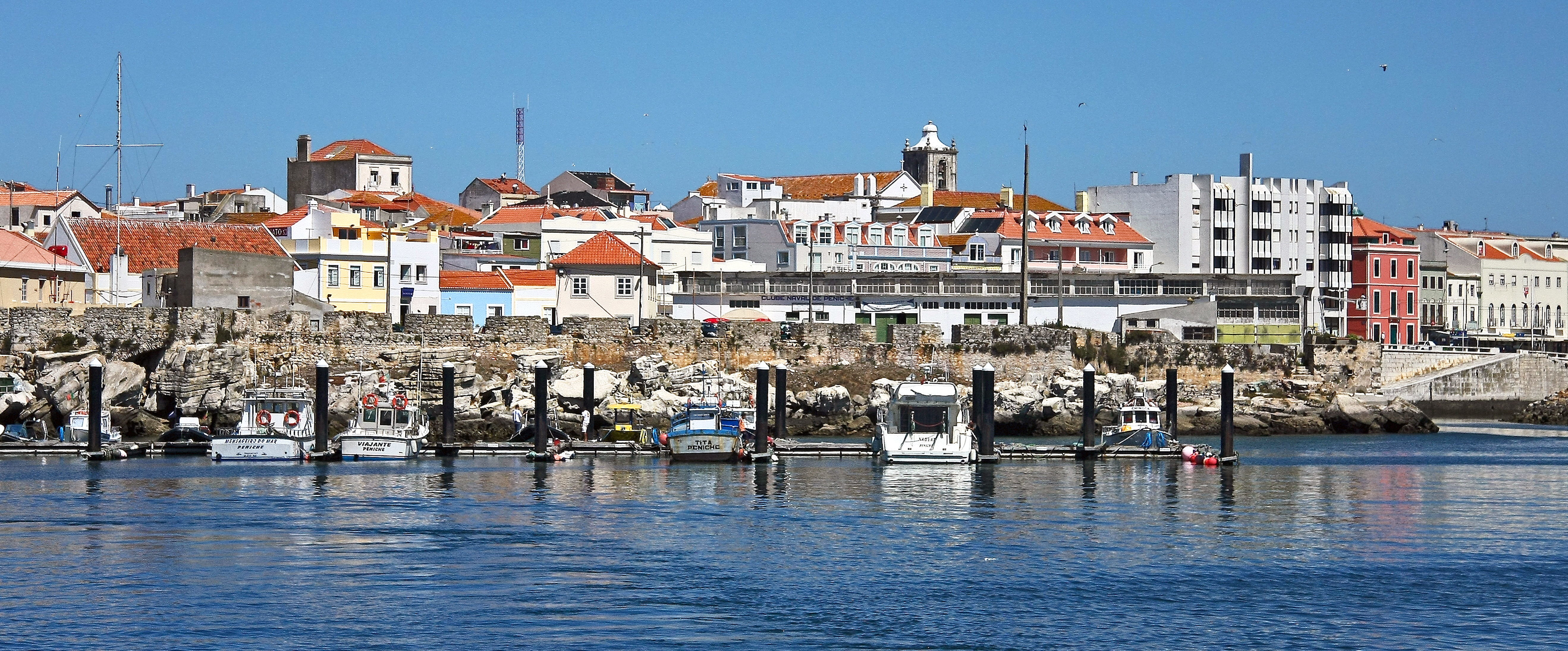
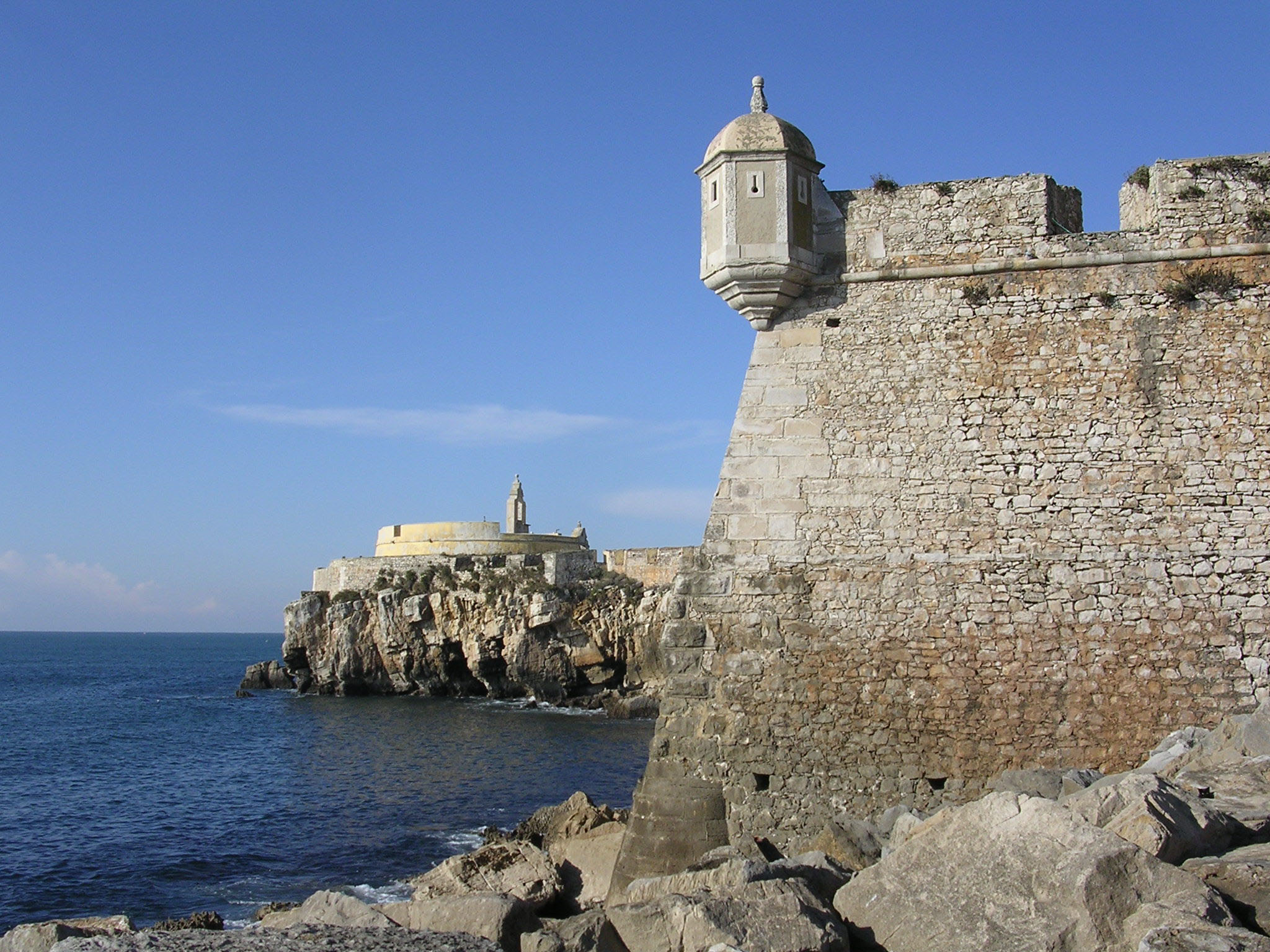
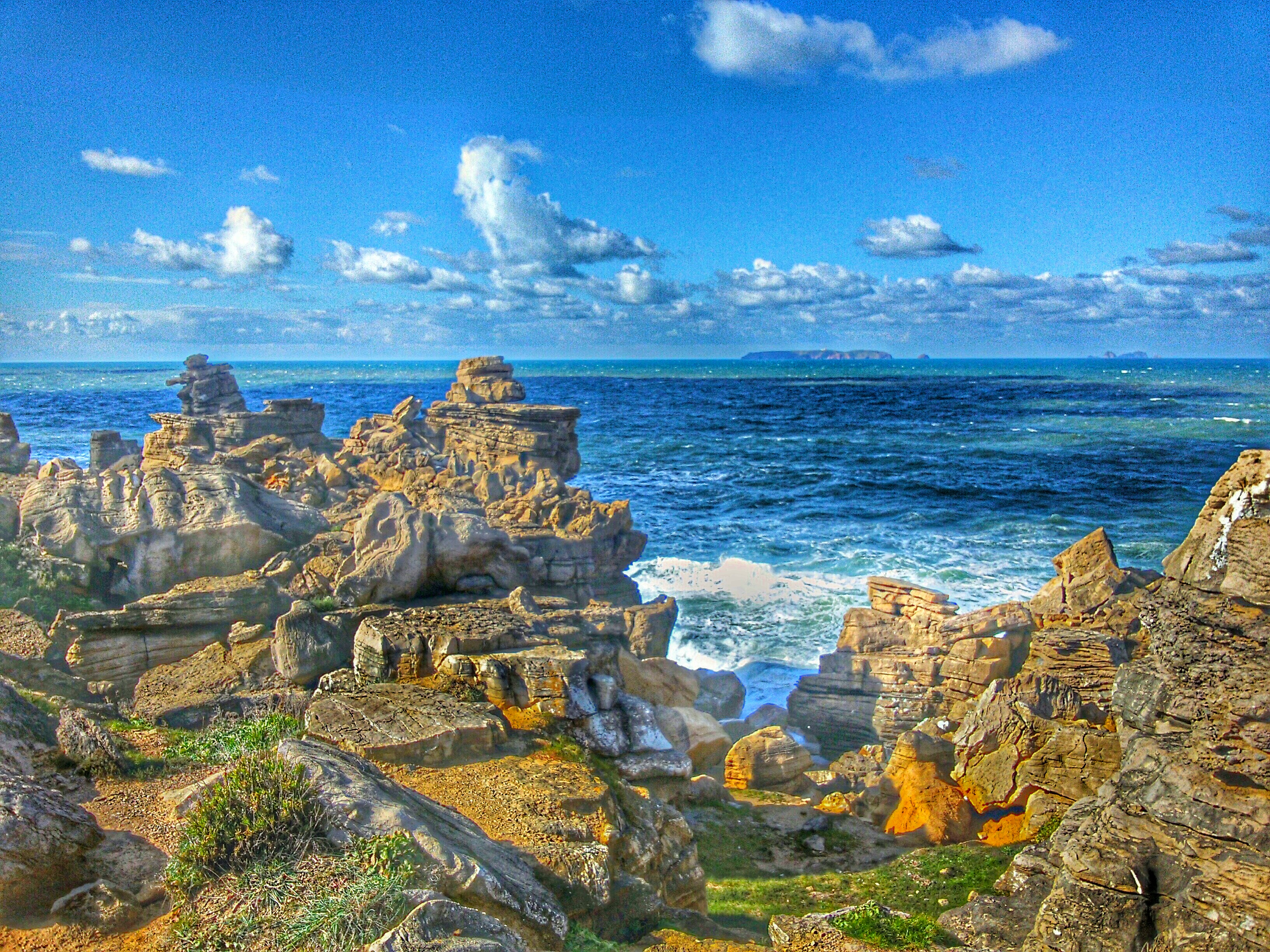

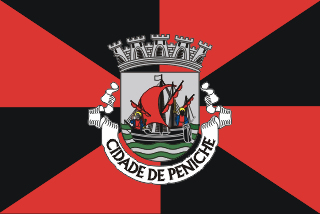
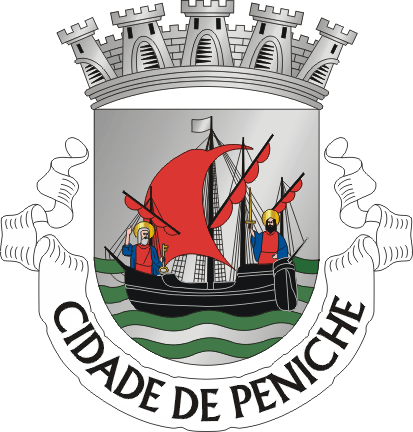
- Flag Coat of arms
- Interactive map of Peniche
- Coordinates: 39°21′N 9°22′W
- Country: Portugal
- Region: Oeste e Vale do Tejo
- Intermunic. comm.: Oeste
- District: Leiria
- Parishes: 4

Government
  - President: Filipe Sales (PSD)

Area
  - Total: 77.55 km^{2} (29.94 sq mi)

Population (2011)
  - Total: 26,431
  - Density: 340.8/km^{2} (882.7/sq mi)
- Time zone: UTC+00:00 (WET)
  - Summer (DST): UTC+01:00 (WEST)
- Local holiday: Monday after the 1st Sunday of August
- Website: www.cm-peniche.pt

Peniche (Portuguese pronunciation: [pɨˈniʃɨ]), officially the City of Peniche (Portuguese: Cidade de Peniche), is a seaside municipality and a city in the Oeste region, in the historical province of Estremadura, and in the Leiria District. It has 26,431 inhabitants, in an area of 77.55 km^{2}. The city itself has a population of about 15,600 inhabitants. The present mayor is Filipe Sales, elected by the Social Democratic Party. The idiomatic expression Friend from Peniche, used to describe someone who wants to receive things at the expense of other without giving anything in return, comes from here.

== History and landmarks ==
The city was built on a rocky peninsula which is considered by geologists a unique example of the Toarcian turnover during the worldwide Early Jurassic extinction.

Peniche is known for its long beaches, which are popular for recreational activities and sports such as surfing, windsurfing, bodyboarding and kite surfing. These beaches are consistently windy and have good surf breaks with Supertubos, i.e., waves forming fast and powerful tubes, considered among the best in Europe. The area has been called the "European Pipeline", after the Banzai Pipeline in Hawaii.

Peniche Fortress is a notable example of Portuguese coastal defences. During the 20th-century period of authoritarian rule known as the Estado Novo, or Second Republic, it was used as a prison for communists and other opponents of the regime.

The Berlengas islands, about 10 kilometres (6 mi) offshore from the peninsula, are part of the municipality. They form one of the world's first nature reserves. In summer, the islands can be visited by taking a ferryboat from Peniche.

Peniche, with its scenic harbour, white windmills, chapels and long sandy beaches has inspired famous artists like Maurice Boitel.

== Climate ==
Peniche has a warm-summer Mediterranean climate (Köppen: Csb) greatly moderated by the Atlantic Ocean, with mild wet winters and cool dry summers. Its low diurnal temperature variation and little seasonal temperature variation make it remarkably mild year-round. It has a climate very similar to that of San Francisco, California only with warmer nights mainly due to the effects of the Portugal Current.

Despite its latitude in central Portugal, the city has one of the mildest winter night-time temperatures in mainland Europe.

Climate data for Peniche (Cabo Carvoeiro Lighthouse), 1981-2010 normals and extremes
| Month | Jan | Feb | Mar | Apr | May | Jun | Jul | Aug | Sep | Oct | Nov | Dec | Year |
|---|---|---|---|---|---|---|---|---|---|---|---|---|---|
| Record high °C (°F) | 19.5 (67.1) | 22.0 (71.6) | 27.8 (82.0) | 28.5 (83.3) | 32.1 (89.8) | 30.2 (86.4) | 31.0 (87.8) | 36.7 (98.1) | 33.3 (91.9) | 30.5 (86.9) | 25.0 (77.0) | 21.2 (70.2) | 36.7 (98.1) |
| Mean daily maximum °C (°F) | 14.3 (57.7) | 14.7 (58.5) | 15.9 (60.6) | 16.3 (61.3) | 17.7 (63.9) | 19.6 (67.3) | 20.5 (68.9) | 21.1 (70.0) | 20.9 (69.6) | 19.3 (66.7) | 17.1 (62.8) | 15.2 (59.4) | 17.7 (63.9) |
| Daily mean °C (°F) | 11.9 (53.4) | 12.3 (54.1) | 13.6 (56.5) | 14.2 (57.6) | 15.8 (60.4) | 17.8 (64.0) | 18.6 (65.5) | 19.0 (66.2) | 18.7 (65.7) | 17.1 (62.8) | 14.8 (58.6) | 12.8 (55.0) | 15.6 (60.0) |
| Mean daily minimum °C (°F) | 9.4 (48.9) | 10.0 (50.0) | 11.3 (52.3) | 12.1 (53.8) | 13.8 (56.8) | 15.9 (60.6) | 16.8 (62.2) | 17.0 (62.6) | 16.6 (61.9) | 15.0 (59.0) | 12.6 (54.7) | 10.5 (50.9) | 13.4 (56.1) |
| Record low °C (°F) | 0.0 (32.0) | 1.5 (34.7) | 0.0 (32.0) | 4.0 (39.2) | 7.6 (45.7) | 10.2 (50.4) | 13.0 (55.4) | 12.5 (54.5) | 10.5 (50.9) | 9.5 (49.1) | 5.0 (41.0) | 2.8 (37.0) | 0.0 (32.0) |
| Average rainfall mm (inches) | 78.8 (3.10) | 63.5 (2.50) | 40.9 (1.61) | 53.1 (2.09) | 37.8 (1.49) | 14.6 (0.57) | 6.2 (0.24) | 10.3 (0.41) | 27.5 (1.08) | 86.1 (3.39) | 101.0 (3.98) | 86.4 (3.40) | 606.2 (23.86) |
| Average rainy days (≥ 1 mm) | 10.3 | 8.7 | 6.2 | 8.4 | 6.0 | 2.6 | 1.1 | 1.7 | 4.6 | 9.3 | 9.9 | 10.8 | 79.6 |
Source: Instituto de Meteorologia

Climate data for Peniche (Cabo Carvoeiro Lighthouse), 1971-2000 normals and extremes
| Month | Jan | Feb | Mar | Apr | May | Jun | Jul | Aug | Sep | Oct | Nov | Dec | Year |
|---|---|---|---|---|---|---|---|---|---|---|---|---|---|
| Record high °C (°F) | 20.0 (68.0) | 22.0 (71.6) | 25.5 (77.9) | 28.5 (83.3) | 31.0 (87.8) | 30.5 (86.9) | 31.0 (87.8) | 30.2 (86.4) | 31.5 (88.7) | 30.5 (86.9) | 25.0 (77.0) | 21.2 (70.2) | 31.5 (88.7) |
| Mean daily maximum °C (°F) | 14.2 (57.6) | 14.5 (58.1) | 15.5 (59.9) | 15.9 (60.6) | 17.2 (63.0) | 19.1 (66.4) | 20.3 (68.5) | 20.7 (69.3) | 20.6 (69.1) | 18.9 (66.0) | 17.0 (62.6) | 15.1 (59.2) | 17.4 (63.4) |
| Daily mean °C (°F) | 11.7 (53.1) | 12.2 (54.0) | 13.2 (55.8) | 13.7 (56.7) | 15.2 (59.4) | 17.1 (62.8) | 18.3 (64.9) | 18.7 (65.7) | 18.4 (65.1) | 16.7 (62.1) | 14.6 (58.3) | 12.7 (54.9) | 15.2 (59.4) |
| Mean daily minimum °C (°F) | 9.2 (48.6) | 9.9 (49.8) | 10.8 (51.4) | 11.6 (52.9) | 13.3 (55.9) | 15.2 (59.4) | 16.4 (61.5) | 16.6 (61.9) | 16.2 (61.2) | 14.5 (58.1) | 12.2 (54.0) | 10.3 (50.5) | 13.0 (55.4) |
| Record low °C (°F) | 0.0 (32.0) | 1.1 (34.0) | 0.0 (32.0) | 4.0 (39.2) | 6.0 (42.8) | 9.0 (48.2) | 7.4 (45.3) | 10.5 (50.9) | 10.5 (50.9) | 6.8 (44.2) | 5.0 (41.0) | 0.9 (33.6) | 0.0 (32.0) |
| Average rainfall mm (inches) | 78.8 (3.10) | 69.8 (2.75) | 40.6 (1.60) | 51.8 (2.04) | 44.4 (1.75) | 17.7 (0.70) | 5.7 (0.22) | 9.1 (0.36) | 25.3 (1.00) | 76.2 (3.00) | 83.8 (3.30) | 88.1 (3.47) | 591.3 (23.29) |
| Average rainy days (≥ 0.1 mm) | 13.1 | 12.3 | 10.0 | 12.2 | 9.1 | 4.9 | 2.3 | 3.0 | 6.1 | 11.1 | 11.9 | 13.6 | 109.6 |
Source: Instituto de Meteorologia

== Economy ==
Since ancient times Peniche has been an important fishing harbour. Besides fisheries, the economy of the Peniche municipality relies on agriculture, services and tourism.

Two versions of the AW-Energy WaveRoller have been tested about 800 m off the coast of Peniche, in 2012 and 2019–2021. This device sits on the seabed and harnesses wave power from the surging motion of nearshore waves, feeding power into the local electricity grid.

== Education ==
Besides schools for primary, secondary and vocational education, Peniche is home to a state-run polytechnic school of the Instituto Politécnico de Leiria, which through its Escola Superior de Turismo e Tecnologia do Mar de Peniche, awards academic degrees in marine technologies and tourism.

== Parishes ==
Administratively, the municipality is divided into 4 civil parishes (freguesias):

- Atouguia da Baleia
- Ferrel
- Peniche
- Serra d'El-Rei

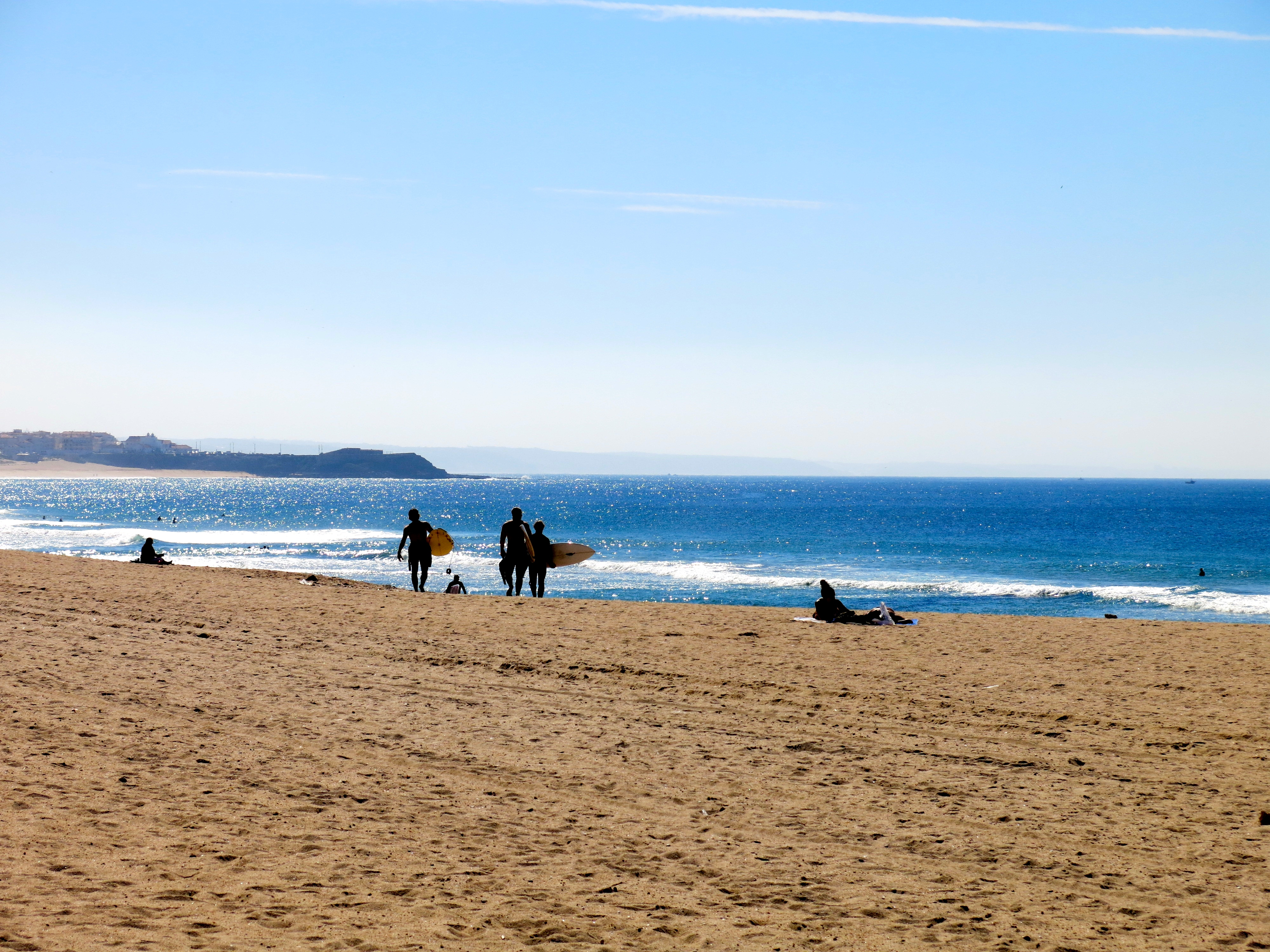
Surfers at Peniche

== Surfing ==
Peniche is one of the best surfing locations in Europe. It has beaches and breaks facing three distinctly different directions, making it a consistent destination for surfers. Home to many surf camps/schools, it annually hosts the MEO Rip Curl Pro Portugal from the World championship tour of the World Surf League (WSL) at the Supertubos beach.

== Sports ==
The football club of the city is called Grupo Desportivo de Peniche.

Peniche Amigos Clube is known nationally for their Triathlon and Futsal teams.

Clube Stella Maris is known nationally for their basketball and badminton teams. The club gives the population a pavilion which hosts many sport-related events.

The city annually hosts the Triatlo de Peniche, which unites the Portuguese Cup and the National Universities Championships with the historical event, the first ever in Portugal.

The best-known athletes from Peniche are Telma Santos, who has participated in the 2012 Summer Olympics in London and the 2016 Summer Olympics in Rio de Janeiro; Silvano Lourenço, the European bodyboarding champion in 2007; and Victoria Kaminskaya who participated in the swimming competitions of the 2016 Summer Olympics.

Peniche is internationally renowned for its exceptional conditions for practising water sports such as surfing, bodyboarding, and diving. Supertubos Beach, also known as Praia do Medão, hosts numerous international events related to these sports. Other notable beaches include Da Gambôa and Baleal.

== Notable people ==
- Antônio Ferreira Viçoso (1787-1875) a Portuguese Roman Catholic prelate, Bishop of Mariana, 1843-1875
- Ricardo Costa (1940–2021) a Portuguese film director.
- Albertino João Santos Pereira (1967–2010) stage name Beto, a Portuguese singer.
- Carlos Leitão (born 1959), Canadian economist and politician
- Telma Santos (born 1983) a Portuguese badminton player, competed at the 2012 and 2016 Summer Olympics

== Gallery ==
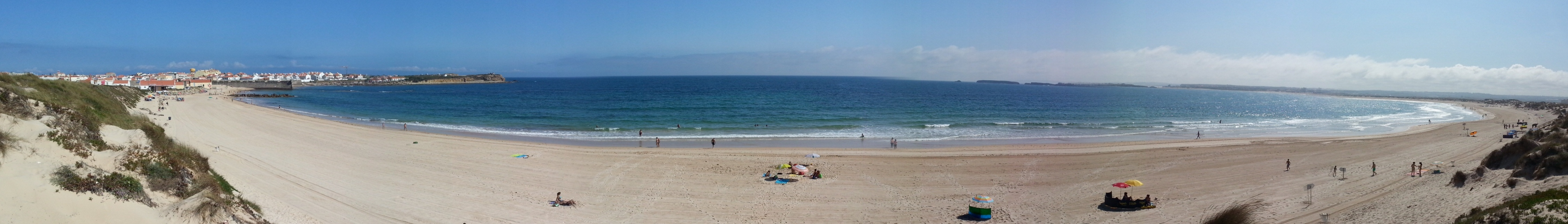
Peniche
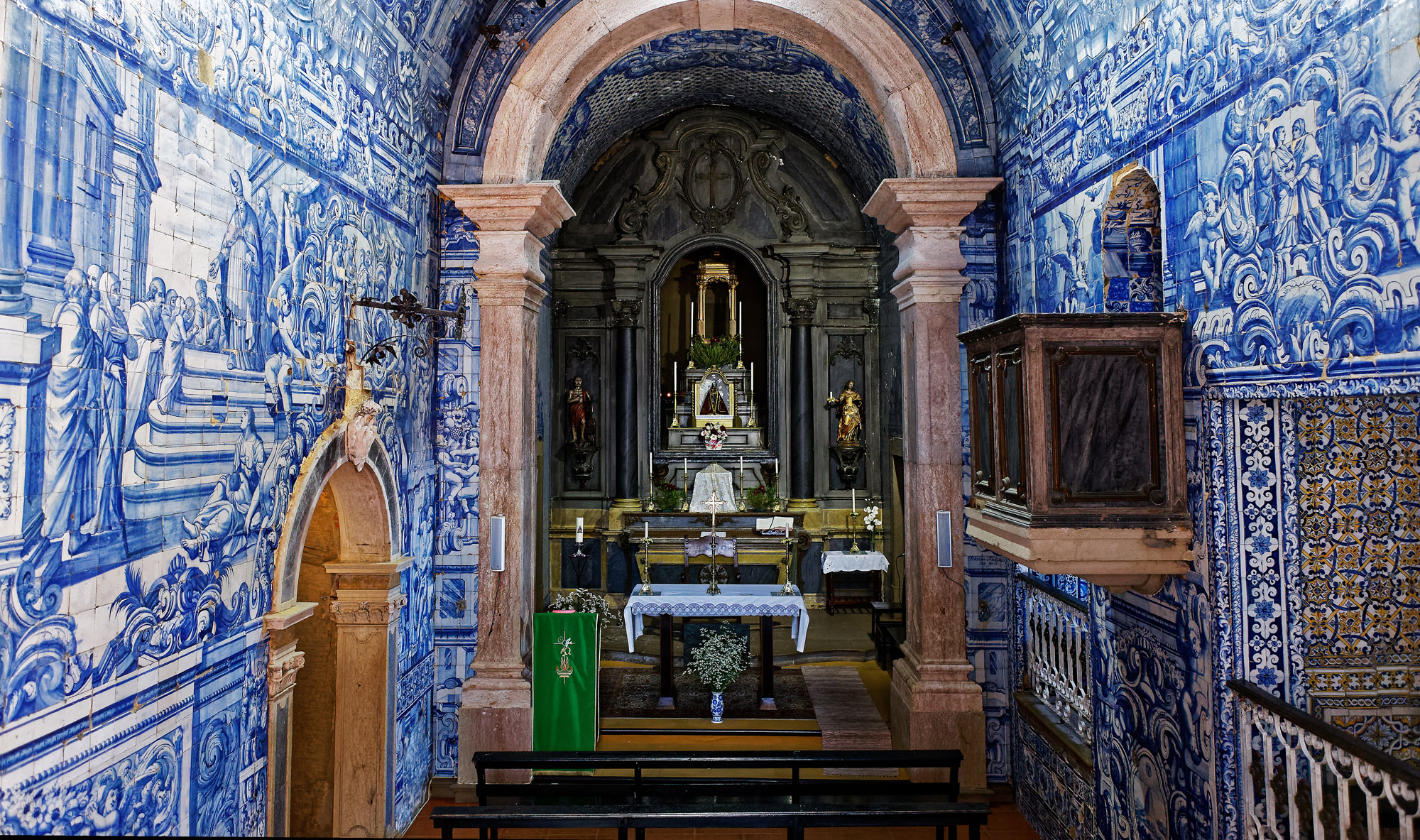
interiors azulejos of Remedios chapel in Peniche, Portugal

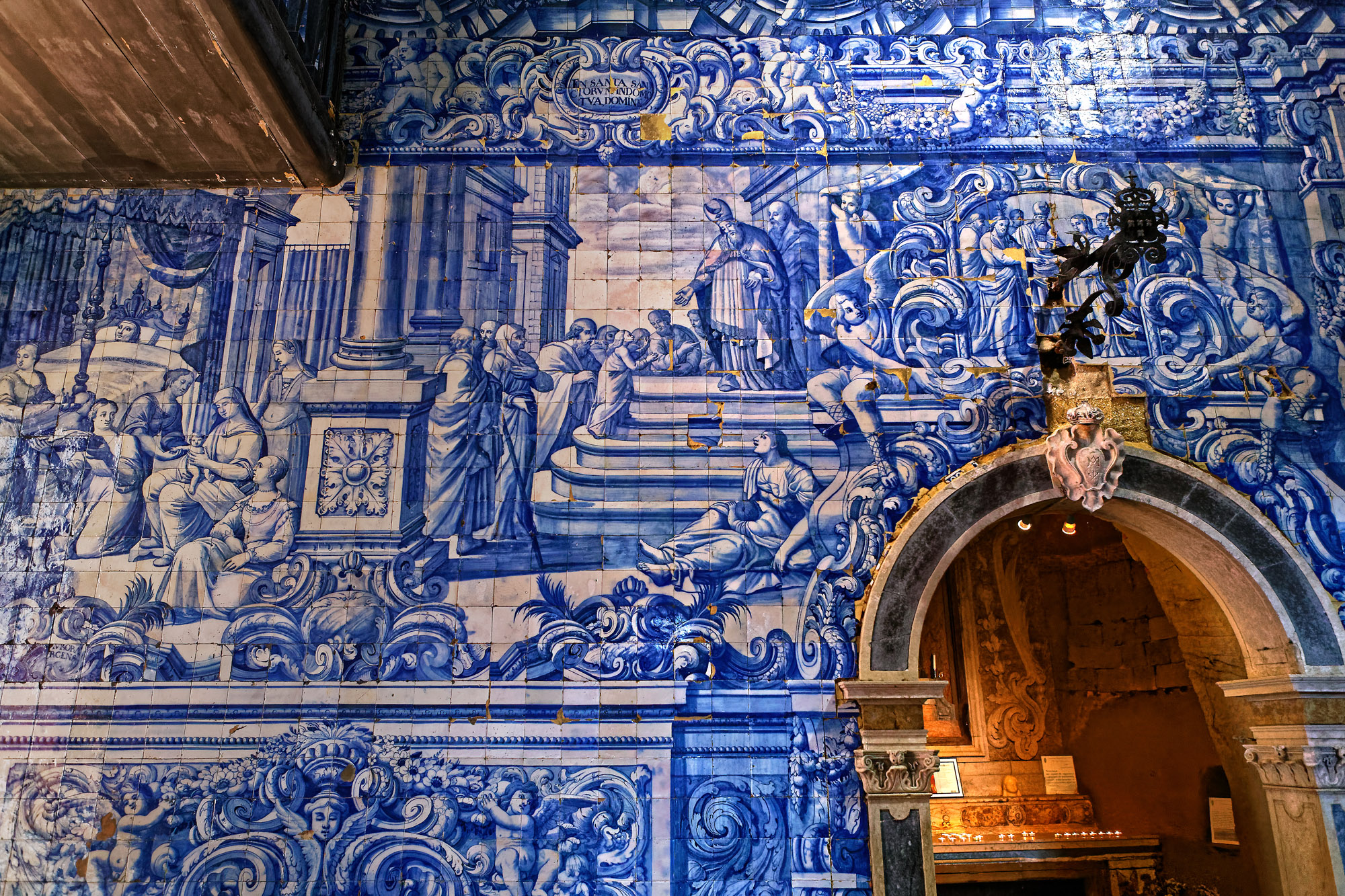
interiors azulejos of Remedios chapel in Peniche, Portugal

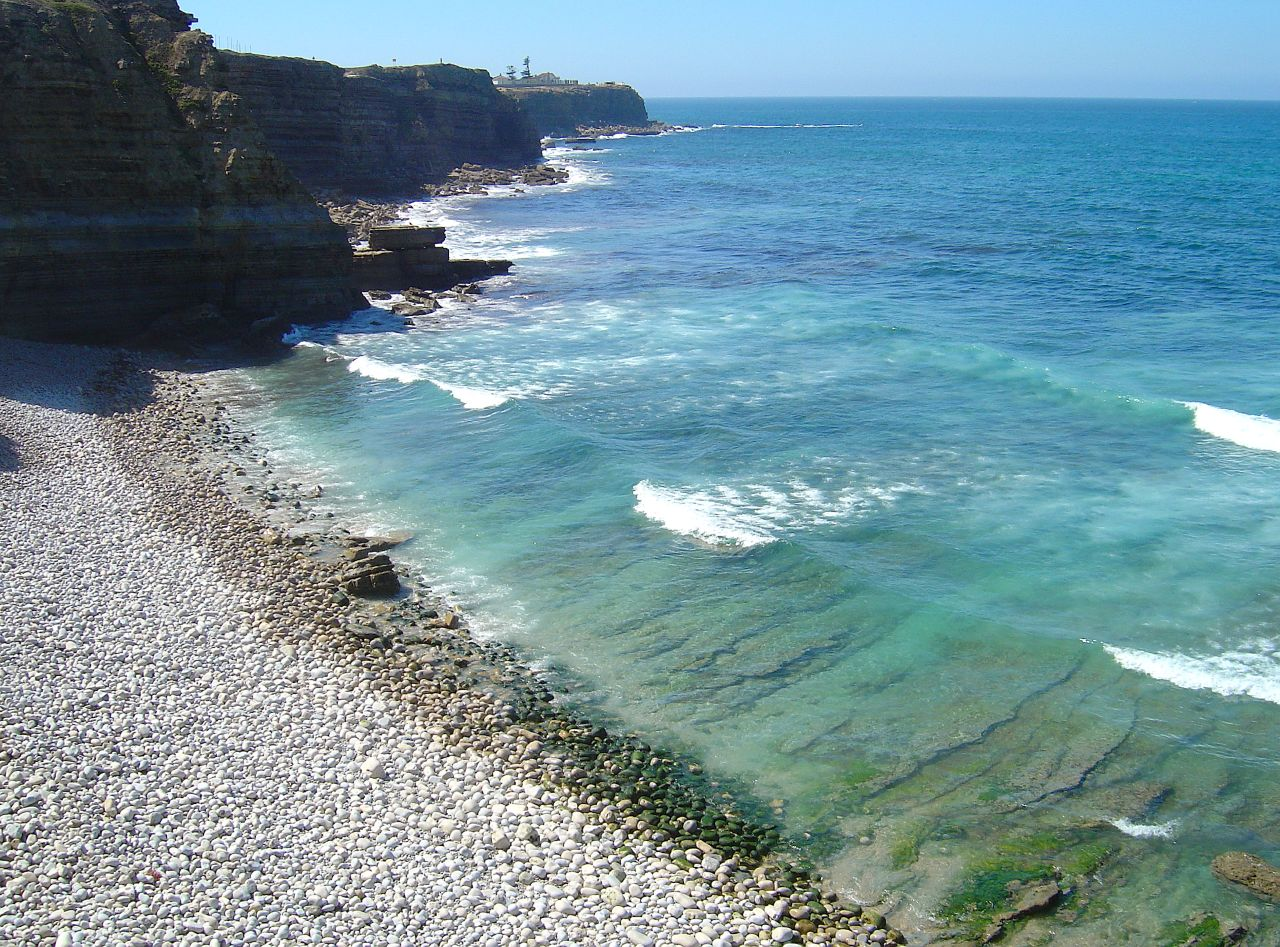
Beach

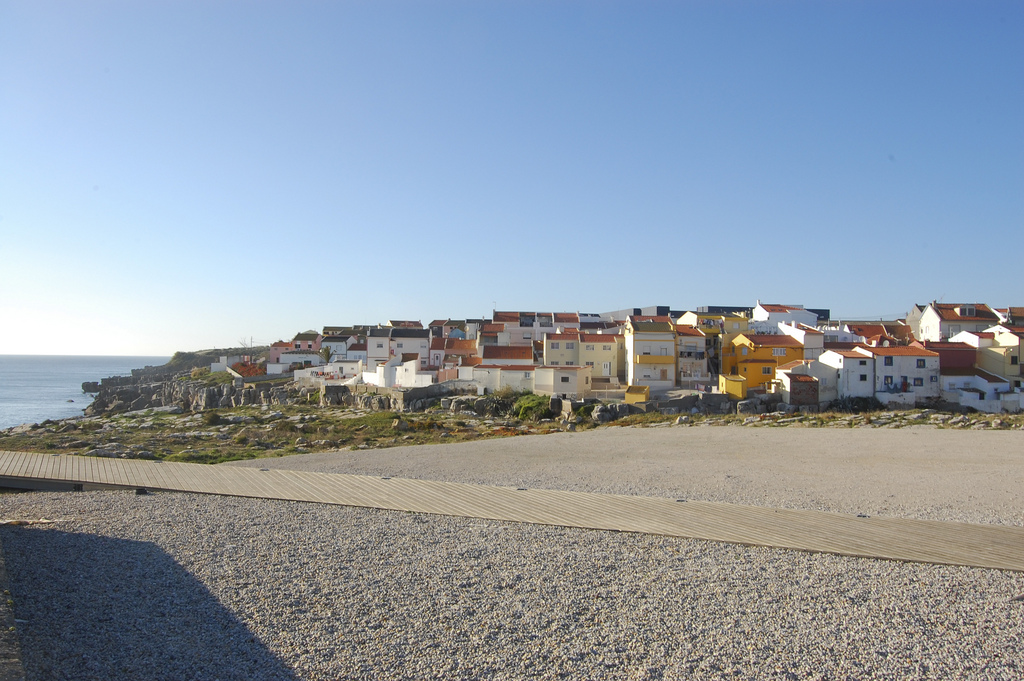
Peniche

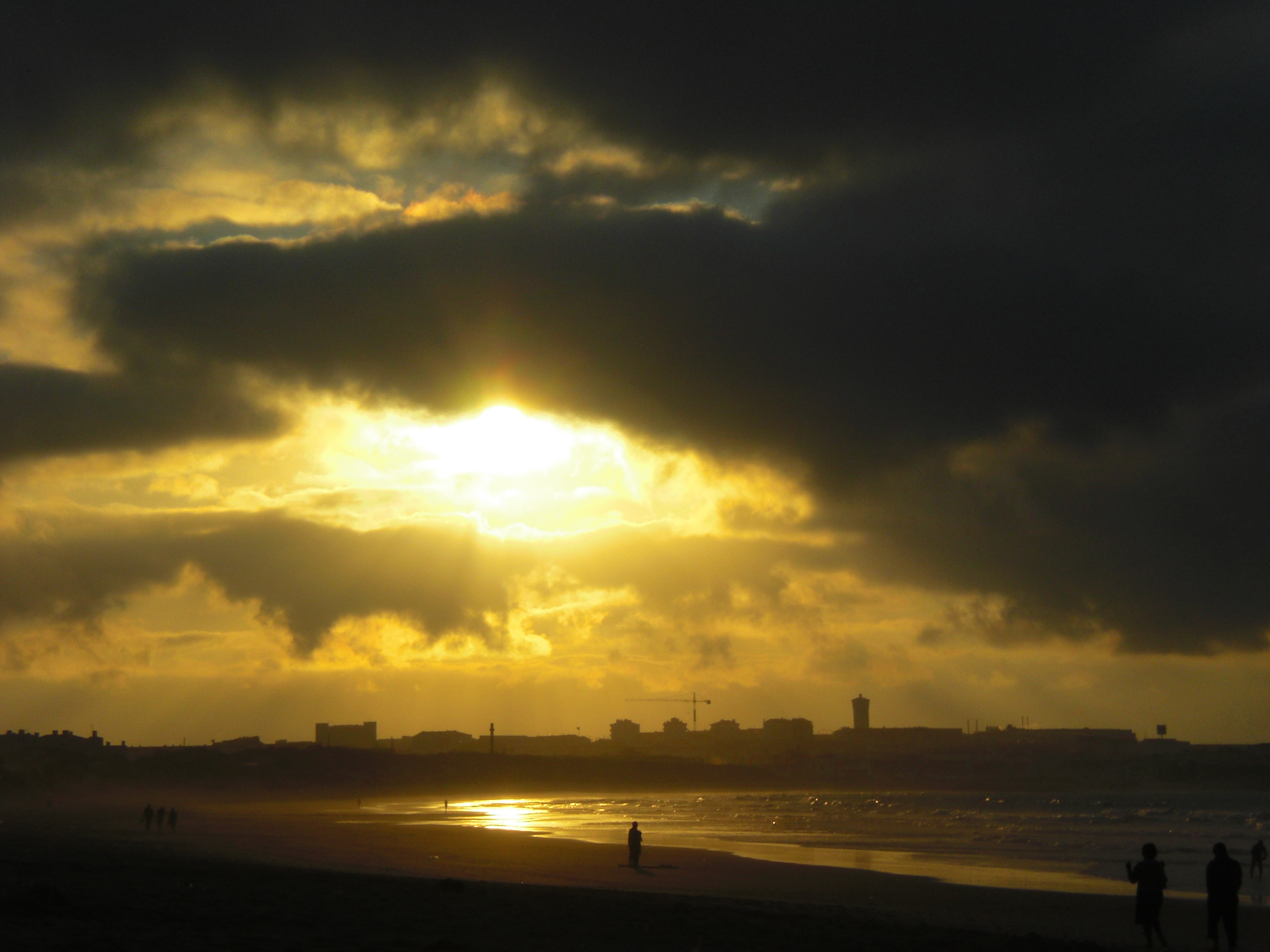
Peniche

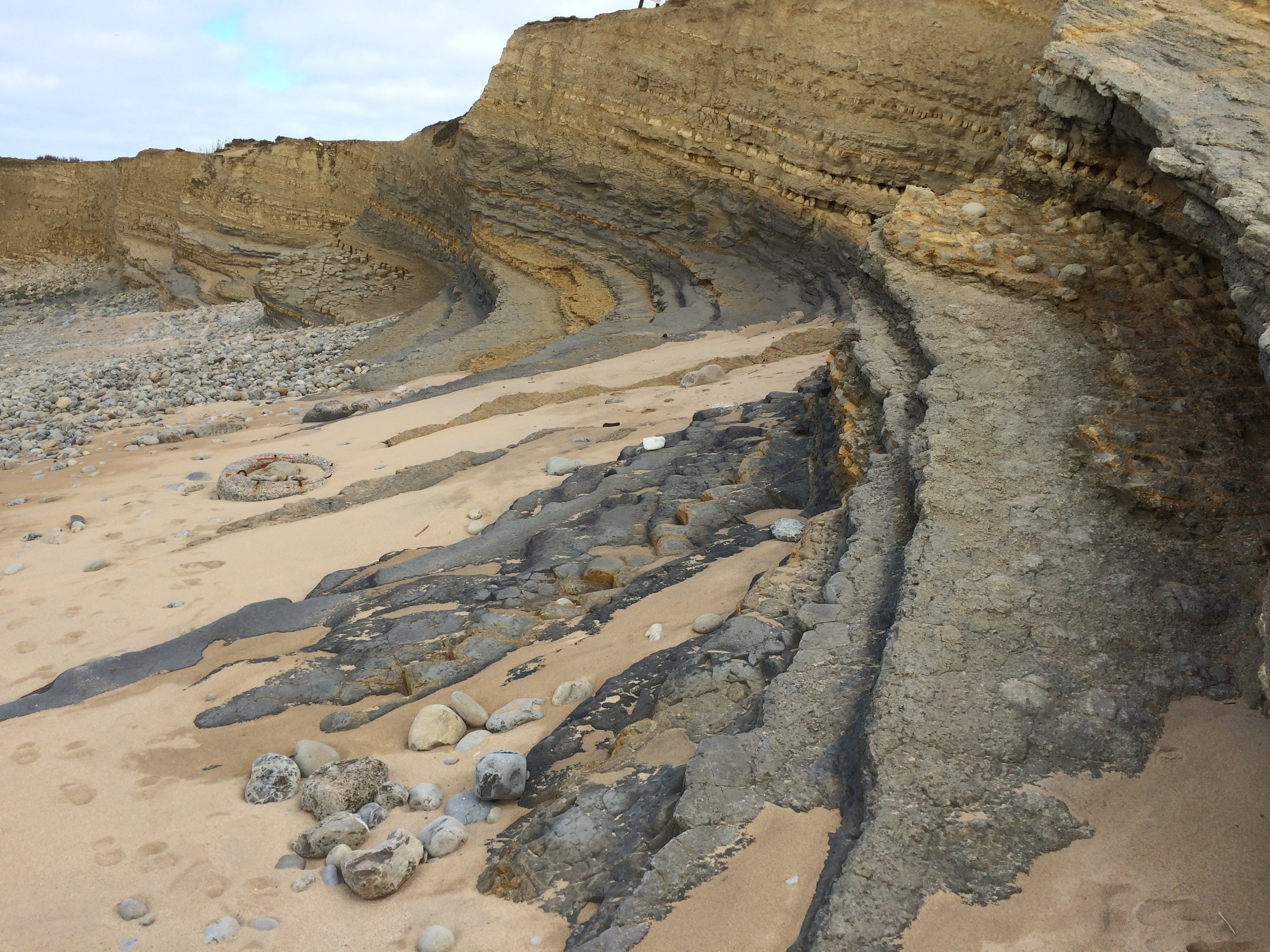
Peniche

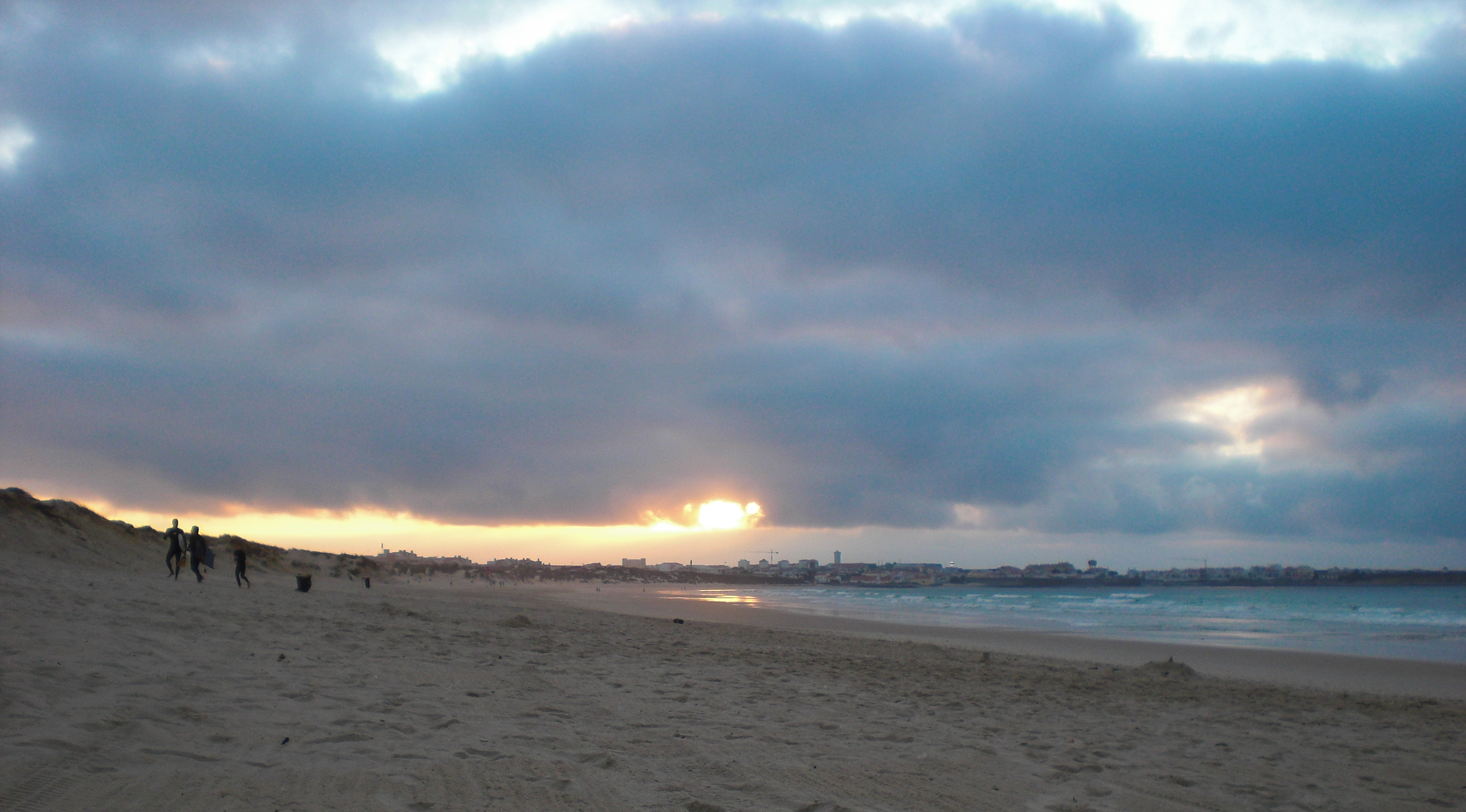
Peniche

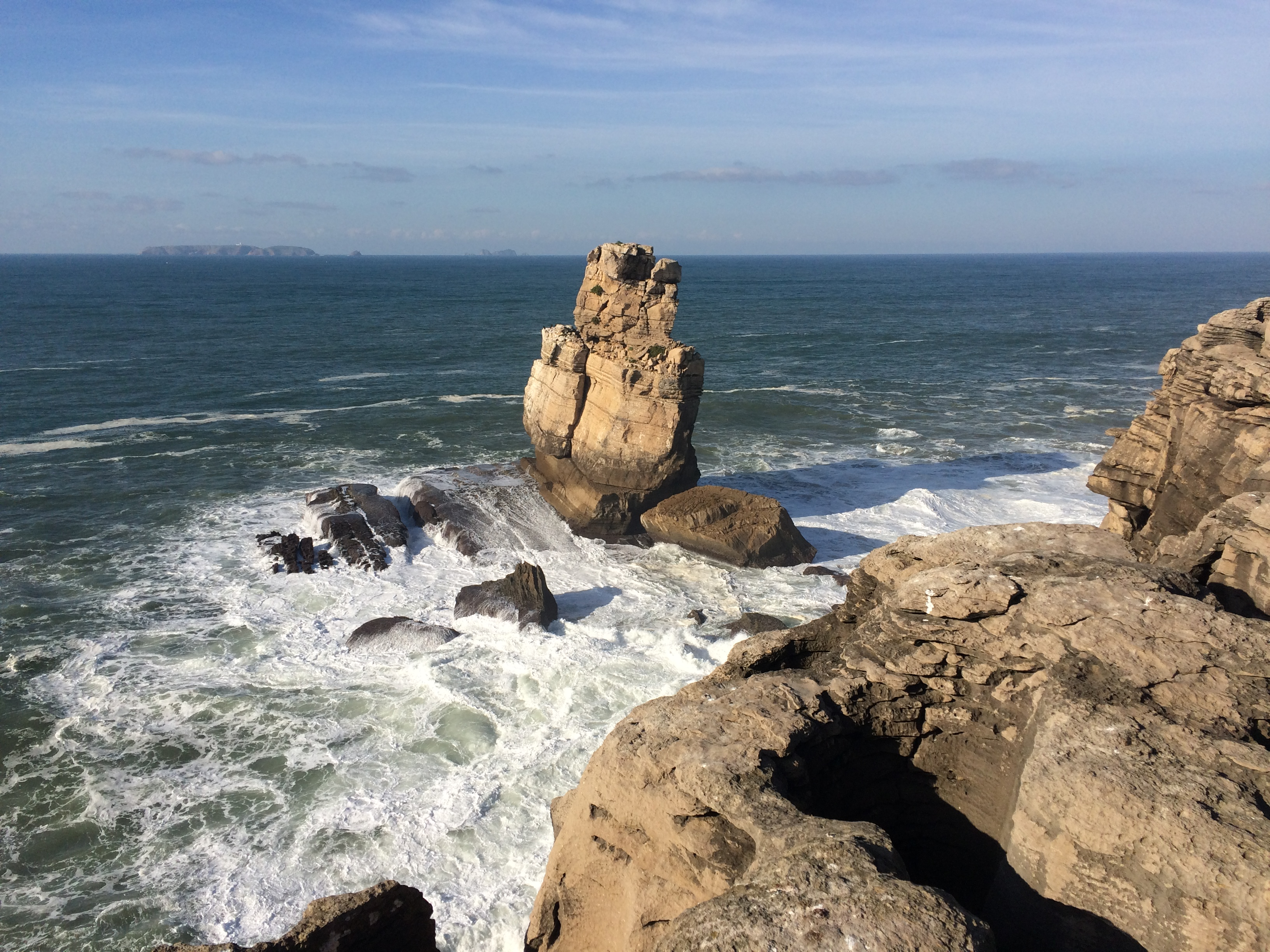
Nau dos Corvos, a rock formation that is one of Peniche's landmarks

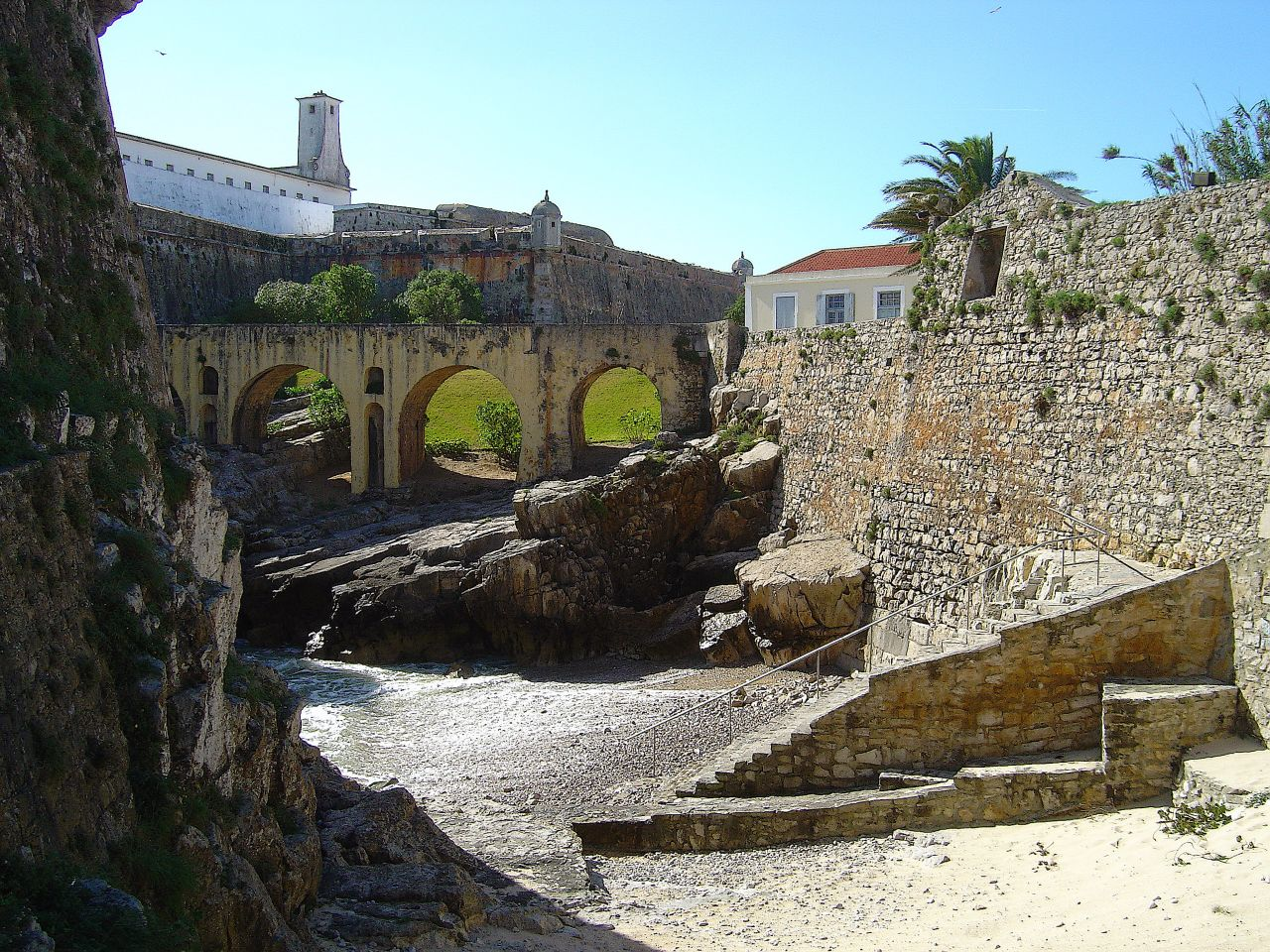
Old harbour walls at Peniche

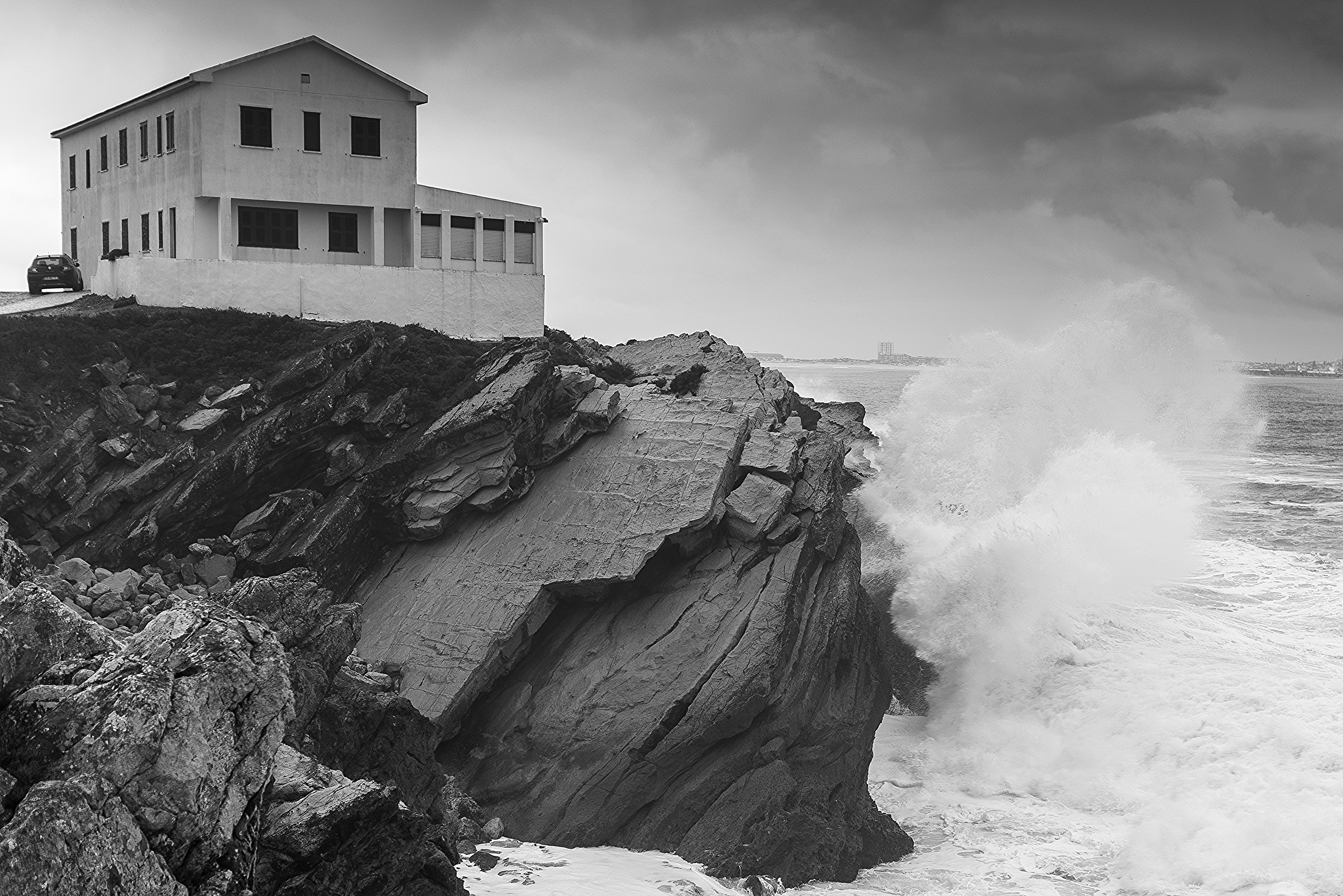
Peniche

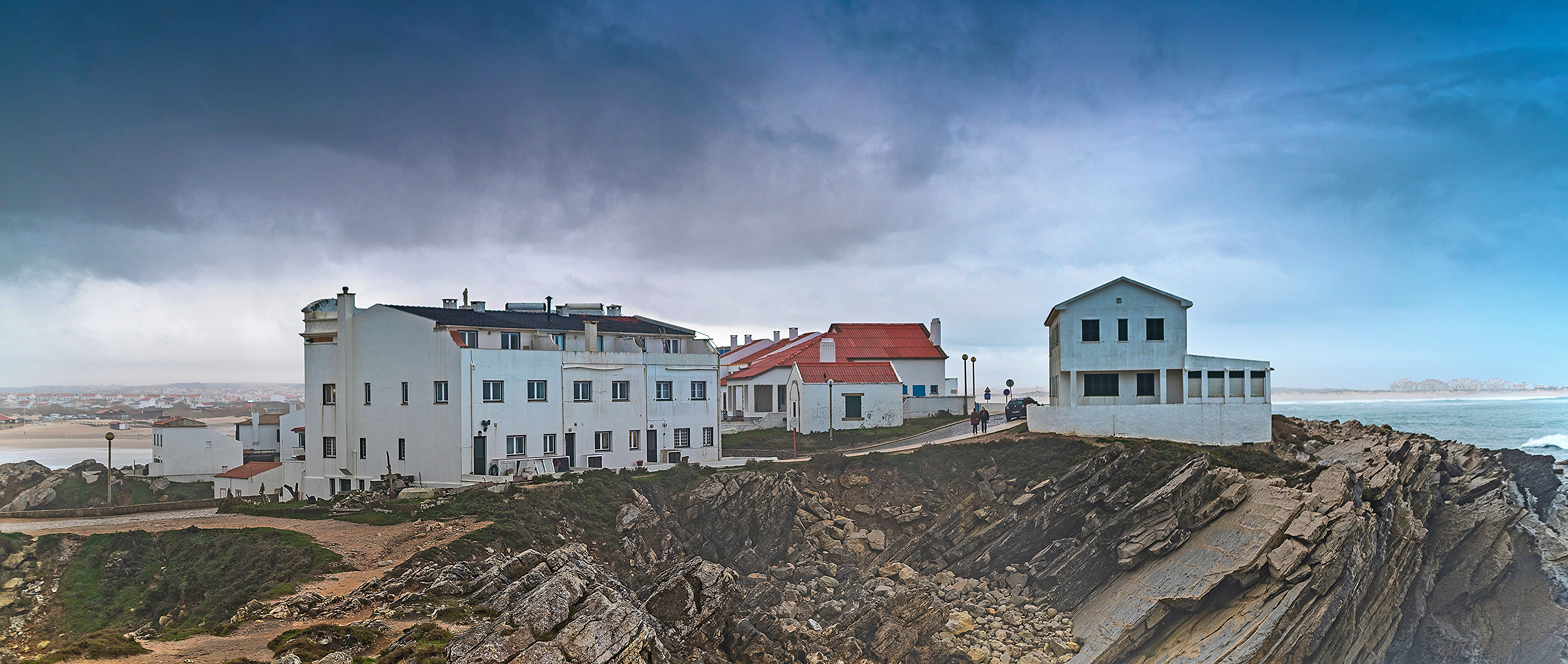
Peniche

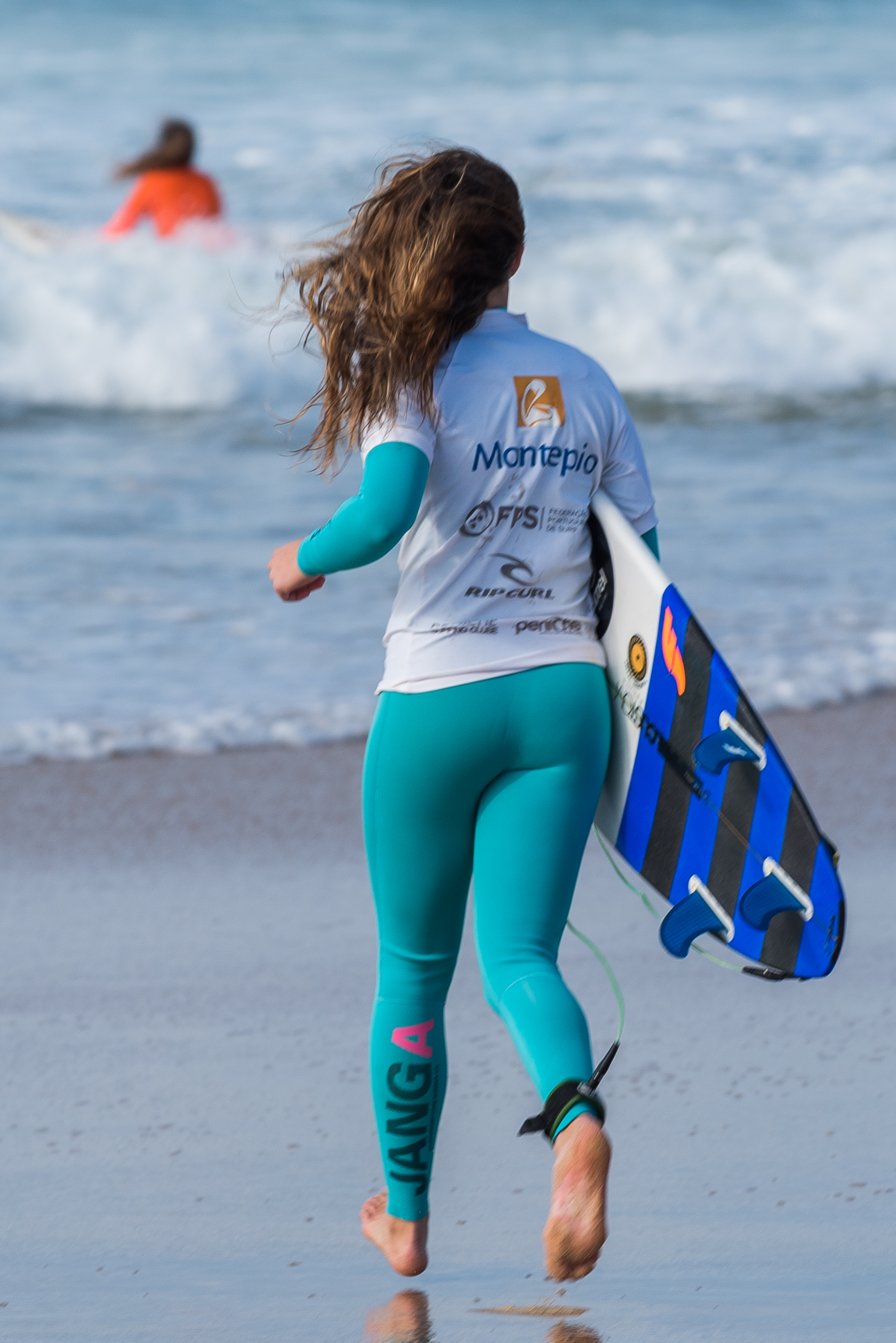
